

273001–273100 

|-bgcolor=#E9E9E9
| 273001 ||  || — || February 23, 2006 || Anderson Mesa || LONEOS || — || align=right | 3.9 km || 
|-id=002 bgcolor=#d6d6d6
| 273002 ||  || — || February 20, 2006 || Kitt Peak || Spacewatch || KOR || align=right | 2.3 km || 
|-id=003 bgcolor=#d6d6d6
| 273003 ||  || — || February 21, 2006 || Mount Lemmon || Mount Lemmon Survey || — || align=right | 3.3 km || 
|-id=004 bgcolor=#d6d6d6
| 273004 ||  || — || February 22, 2006 || Mount Lemmon || Mount Lemmon Survey || — || align=right | 5.5 km || 
|-id=005 bgcolor=#E9E9E9
| 273005 ||  || — || February 24, 2006 || Kitt Peak || Spacewatch || — || align=right | 3.0 km || 
|-id=006 bgcolor=#d6d6d6
| 273006 ||  || — || February 24, 2006 || Kitt Peak || Spacewatch || — || align=right | 2.8 km || 
|-id=007 bgcolor=#E9E9E9
| 273007 ||  || — || February 24, 2006 || Kitt Peak || Spacewatch || — || align=right | 2.5 km || 
|-id=008 bgcolor=#E9E9E9
| 273008 ||  || — || February 24, 2006 || Kitt Peak || Spacewatch || WIT || align=right | 1.5 km || 
|-id=009 bgcolor=#d6d6d6
| 273009 ||  || — || February 24, 2006 || Kitt Peak || Spacewatch || — || align=right | 3.7 km || 
|-id=010 bgcolor=#E9E9E9
| 273010 ||  || — || February 24, 2006 || Kitt Peak || Spacewatch || MRX || align=right | 1.4 km || 
|-id=011 bgcolor=#d6d6d6
| 273011 ||  || — || February 24, 2006 || Kitt Peak || Spacewatch || K-2 || align=right | 1.9 km || 
|-id=012 bgcolor=#d6d6d6
| 273012 ||  || — || February 24, 2006 || Kitt Peak || Spacewatch || KOR || align=right | 1.5 km || 
|-id=013 bgcolor=#d6d6d6
| 273013 ||  || — || October 13, 1994 || Kitt Peak || Spacewatch || KOR || align=right | 1.5 km || 
|-id=014 bgcolor=#d6d6d6
| 273014 ||  || — || February 24, 2006 || Kitt Peak || Spacewatch || KAR || align=right | 1.7 km || 
|-id=015 bgcolor=#d6d6d6
| 273015 ||  || — || February 24, 2006 || Kitt Peak || Spacewatch || — || align=right | 3.3 km || 
|-id=016 bgcolor=#d6d6d6
| 273016 ||  || — || February 24, 2006 || Kitt Peak || Spacewatch || 628 || align=right | 2.6 km || 
|-id=017 bgcolor=#d6d6d6
| 273017 ||  || — || February 24, 2006 || Kitt Peak || Spacewatch || — || align=right | 3.0 km || 
|-id=018 bgcolor=#d6d6d6
| 273018 ||  || — || February 24, 2006 || Kitt Peak || Spacewatch || — || align=right | 4.2 km || 
|-id=019 bgcolor=#E9E9E9
| 273019 ||  || — || February 24, 2006 || Mount Lemmon || Mount Lemmon Survey || — || align=right | 2.4 km || 
|-id=020 bgcolor=#d6d6d6
| 273020 ||  || — || February 24, 2006 || Kitt Peak || Spacewatch || — || align=right | 3.2 km || 
|-id=021 bgcolor=#d6d6d6
| 273021 ||  || — || February 24, 2006 || Kitt Peak || Spacewatch || — || align=right | 4.0 km || 
|-id=022 bgcolor=#fefefe
| 273022 ||  || — || February 25, 2006 || Kitt Peak || Spacewatch || — || align=right | 1.4 km || 
|-id=023 bgcolor=#d6d6d6
| 273023 ||  || — || February 25, 2006 || Kitt Peak || Spacewatch || — || align=right | 3.5 km || 
|-id=024 bgcolor=#d6d6d6
| 273024 ||  || — || February 25, 2006 || Kitt Peak || Spacewatch || CHA || align=right | 3.3 km || 
|-id=025 bgcolor=#E9E9E9
| 273025 ||  || — || February 25, 2006 || Kitt Peak || Spacewatch || — || align=right | 2.1 km || 
|-id=026 bgcolor=#E9E9E9
| 273026 ||  || — || February 27, 2006 || Mount Lemmon || Mount Lemmon Survey || MRX || align=right | 1.4 km || 
|-id=027 bgcolor=#d6d6d6
| 273027 ||  || — || February 27, 2006 || Mount Lemmon || Mount Lemmon Survey || — || align=right | 4.3 km || 
|-id=028 bgcolor=#d6d6d6
| 273028 ||  || — || February 27, 2006 || Mount Lemmon || Mount Lemmon Survey || CHA || align=right | 2.5 km || 
|-id=029 bgcolor=#d6d6d6
| 273029 ||  || — || February 27, 2006 || Kitt Peak || Spacewatch || KOR || align=right | 2.2 km || 
|-id=030 bgcolor=#E9E9E9
| 273030 ||  || — || February 27, 2006 || Socorro || LINEAR || DOR || align=right | 2.8 km || 
|-id=031 bgcolor=#E9E9E9
| 273031 ||  || — || February 27, 2006 || Kitt Peak || Spacewatch || AST || align=right | 2.3 km || 
|-id=032 bgcolor=#d6d6d6
| 273032 ||  || — || February 27, 2006 || Kitt Peak || Spacewatch || — || align=right | 3.9 km || 
|-id=033 bgcolor=#E9E9E9
| 273033 ||  || — || February 20, 2006 || Catalina || CSS || — || align=right | 2.4 km || 
|-id=034 bgcolor=#E9E9E9
| 273034 ||  || — || February 23, 2006 || Anderson Mesa || LONEOS || — || align=right | 4.5 km || 
|-id=035 bgcolor=#E9E9E9
| 273035 ||  || — || February 25, 2006 || Kitt Peak || Spacewatch || AGN || align=right | 1.2 km || 
|-id=036 bgcolor=#E9E9E9
| 273036 ||  || — || February 25, 2006 || Kitt Peak || Spacewatch || AGN || align=right | 1.3 km || 
|-id=037 bgcolor=#E9E9E9
| 273037 ||  || — || February 25, 2006 || Mount Lemmon || Mount Lemmon Survey || — || align=right | 2.0 km || 
|-id=038 bgcolor=#E9E9E9
| 273038 ||  || — || February 25, 2006 || Kitt Peak || Spacewatch || AGN || align=right | 1.4 km || 
|-id=039 bgcolor=#d6d6d6
| 273039 ||  || — || February 25, 2006 || Kitt Peak || Spacewatch || SAN || align=right | 3.6 km || 
|-id=040 bgcolor=#E9E9E9
| 273040 ||  || — || February 25, 2006 || Kitt Peak || Spacewatch || — || align=right | 3.1 km || 
|-id=041 bgcolor=#E9E9E9
| 273041 ||  || — || February 25, 2006 || Kitt Peak || Spacewatch || — || align=right | 2.6 km || 
|-id=042 bgcolor=#E9E9E9
| 273042 ||  || — || February 25, 2006 || Kitt Peak || Spacewatch || — || align=right | 2.4 km || 
|-id=043 bgcolor=#d6d6d6
| 273043 ||  || — || February 25, 2006 || Kitt Peak || Spacewatch || KOR || align=right | 1.5 km || 
|-id=044 bgcolor=#E9E9E9
| 273044 ||  || — || February 25, 2006 || Kitt Peak || Spacewatch || AEO || align=right | 1.6 km || 
|-id=045 bgcolor=#E9E9E9
| 273045 ||  || — || February 25, 2006 || Kitt Peak || Spacewatch || AGN || align=right | 1.7 km || 
|-id=046 bgcolor=#d6d6d6
| 273046 ||  || — || February 25, 2006 || Kitt Peak || Spacewatch || — || align=right | 4.3 km || 
|-id=047 bgcolor=#E9E9E9
| 273047 ||  || — || February 25, 2006 || Kitt Peak || Spacewatch || HOF || align=right | 3.9 km || 
|-id=048 bgcolor=#E9E9E9
| 273048 ||  || — || February 25, 2006 || Kitt Peak || Spacewatch || — || align=right | 2.2 km || 
|-id=049 bgcolor=#d6d6d6
| 273049 ||  || — || February 25, 2006 || Mount Lemmon || Mount Lemmon Survey || K-2 || align=right | 1.7 km || 
|-id=050 bgcolor=#E9E9E9
| 273050 ||  || — || February 27, 2006 || Kitt Peak || Spacewatch || — || align=right | 3.1 km || 
|-id=051 bgcolor=#d6d6d6
| 273051 ||  || — || February 27, 2006 || Kitt Peak || Spacewatch || KOR || align=right | 2.2 km || 
|-id=052 bgcolor=#d6d6d6
| 273052 ||  || — || February 27, 2006 || Kitt Peak || Spacewatch || KAR || align=right | 1.2 km || 
|-id=053 bgcolor=#E9E9E9
| 273053 ||  || — || February 27, 2006 || Mount Lemmon || Mount Lemmon Survey || AGN || align=right | 1.4 km || 
|-id=054 bgcolor=#d6d6d6
| 273054 ||  || — || February 27, 2006 || Kitt Peak || Spacewatch || — || align=right | 6.1 km || 
|-id=055 bgcolor=#d6d6d6
| 273055 ||  || — || February 27, 2006 || Kitt Peak || Spacewatch || — || align=right | 3.6 km || 
|-id=056 bgcolor=#d6d6d6
| 273056 ||  || — || February 27, 2006 || Kitt Peak || Spacewatch || 615 || align=right | 1.4 km || 
|-id=057 bgcolor=#d6d6d6
| 273057 ||  || — || February 27, 2006 || Kitt Peak || Spacewatch || — || align=right | 3.9 km || 
|-id=058 bgcolor=#E9E9E9
| 273058 ||  || — || February 27, 2006 || Mount Lemmon || Mount Lemmon Survey || — || align=right | 2.9 km || 
|-id=059 bgcolor=#d6d6d6
| 273059 ||  || — || February 27, 2006 || Mount Lemmon || Mount Lemmon Survey || — || align=right | 4.5 km || 
|-id=060 bgcolor=#d6d6d6
| 273060 ||  || — || February 27, 2006 || Mount Lemmon || Mount Lemmon Survey || — || align=right | 2.6 km || 
|-id=061 bgcolor=#d6d6d6
| 273061 ||  || — || October 24, 2003 || Apache Point || SDSS || — || align=right | 3.6 km || 
|-id=062 bgcolor=#E9E9E9
| 273062 ||  || — || February 27, 2006 || Kitt Peak || Spacewatch || — || align=right | 3.0 km || 
|-id=063 bgcolor=#d6d6d6
| 273063 ||  || — || February 27, 2006 || Kitt Peak || Spacewatch || — || align=right | 4.1 km || 
|-id=064 bgcolor=#d6d6d6
| 273064 ||  || — || February 27, 2006 || Kitt Peak || Spacewatch || KOR || align=right | 2.2 km || 
|-id=065 bgcolor=#d6d6d6
| 273065 ||  || — || February 27, 2006 || Kitt Peak || Spacewatch || — || align=right | 2.3 km || 
|-id=066 bgcolor=#d6d6d6
| 273066 ||  || — || February 27, 2006 || Kitt Peak || Spacewatch || THM || align=right | 2.8 km || 
|-id=067 bgcolor=#E9E9E9
| 273067 ||  || — || February 20, 2006 || Catalina || CSS || — || align=right | 3.2 km || 
|-id=068 bgcolor=#d6d6d6
| 273068 ||  || — || February 24, 2006 || Catalina || CSS || BRA || align=right | 2.2 km || 
|-id=069 bgcolor=#d6d6d6
| 273069 ||  || — || February 24, 2006 || Catalina || CSS || — || align=right | 4.8 km || 
|-id=070 bgcolor=#E9E9E9
| 273070 ||  || — || February 24, 2006 || Kitt Peak || Spacewatch || — || align=right | 2.5 km || 
|-id=071 bgcolor=#d6d6d6
| 273071 ||  || — || February 24, 2006 || Kitt Peak || Spacewatch || — || align=right | 4.3 km || 
|-id=072 bgcolor=#d6d6d6
| 273072 ||  || — || February 20, 2006 || Kitt Peak || Spacewatch || — || align=right | 3.3 km || 
|-id=073 bgcolor=#E9E9E9
| 273073 ||  || — || February 22, 2006 || Anderson Mesa || LONEOS || — || align=right | 3.4 km || 
|-id=074 bgcolor=#E9E9E9
| 273074 ||  || — || February 24, 2006 || Kitt Peak || Spacewatch || AST || align=right | 2.0 km || 
|-id=075 bgcolor=#E9E9E9
| 273075 ||  || — || March 3, 2006 || Nyukasa || Mount Nyukasa Stn. || HEN || align=right | 1.3 km || 
|-id=076 bgcolor=#d6d6d6
| 273076 ||  || — || March 2, 2006 || Kitt Peak || Spacewatch || — || align=right | 4.2 km || 
|-id=077 bgcolor=#E9E9E9
| 273077 ||  || — || March 2, 2006 || Kitt Peak || Spacewatch || NEM || align=right | 2.2 km || 
|-id=078 bgcolor=#d6d6d6
| 273078 ||  || — || March 2, 2006 || Kitt Peak || Spacewatch || — || align=right | 4.7 km || 
|-id=079 bgcolor=#d6d6d6
| 273079 ||  || — || March 2, 2006 || Kitt Peak || Spacewatch || — || align=right | 2.5 km || 
|-id=080 bgcolor=#d6d6d6
| 273080 ||  || — || March 2, 2006 || Kitt Peak || Spacewatch || — || align=right | 2.5 km || 
|-id=081 bgcolor=#E9E9E9
| 273081 ||  || — || March 2, 2006 || Kitt Peak || Spacewatch || AST || align=right | 1.9 km || 
|-id=082 bgcolor=#d6d6d6
| 273082 ||  || — || March 2, 2006 || Kitt Peak || Spacewatch || KOR || align=right | 1.4 km || 
|-id=083 bgcolor=#d6d6d6
| 273083 ||  || — || March 2, 2006 || Kitt Peak || Spacewatch || EOS || align=right | 3.5 km || 
|-id=084 bgcolor=#E9E9E9
| 273084 ||  || — || March 3, 2006 || Kitt Peak || Spacewatch || AGN || align=right | 1.3 km || 
|-id=085 bgcolor=#E9E9E9
| 273085 ||  || — || March 3, 2006 || Kitt Peak || Spacewatch || — || align=right | 2.2 km || 
|-id=086 bgcolor=#E9E9E9
| 273086 ||  || — || March 3, 2006 || Kitt Peak || Spacewatch || — || align=right | 1.7 km || 
|-id=087 bgcolor=#d6d6d6
| 273087 ||  || — || March 3, 2006 || Kitt Peak || Spacewatch || THM || align=right | 2.5 km || 
|-id=088 bgcolor=#E9E9E9
| 273088 ||  || — || March 3, 2006 || Kitt Peak || Spacewatch || WIT || align=right | 1.4 km || 
|-id=089 bgcolor=#E9E9E9
| 273089 ||  || — || March 3, 2006 || Kitt Peak || Spacewatch || — || align=right | 2.9 km || 
|-id=090 bgcolor=#E9E9E9
| 273090 ||  || — || March 4, 2006 || Kitt Peak || Spacewatch || — || align=right | 2.4 km || 
|-id=091 bgcolor=#E9E9E9
| 273091 ||  || — || March 4, 2006 || Kitt Peak || Spacewatch || — || align=right | 2.0 km || 
|-id=092 bgcolor=#E9E9E9
| 273092 ||  || — || March 5, 2006 || Kitt Peak || Spacewatch || DOR || align=right | 3.7 km || 
|-id=093 bgcolor=#d6d6d6
| 273093 ||  || — || March 5, 2006 || Kitt Peak || Spacewatch || CHA || align=right | 2.8 km || 
|-id=094 bgcolor=#d6d6d6
| 273094 ||  || — || March 5, 2006 || Kitt Peak || Spacewatch || — || align=right | 3.9 km || 
|-id=095 bgcolor=#d6d6d6
| 273095 ||  || — || March 5, 2006 || Kitt Peak || Spacewatch || — || align=right | 3.3 km || 
|-id=096 bgcolor=#d6d6d6
| 273096 ||  || — || March 4, 2006 || Kitt Peak || Spacewatch || — || align=right | 2.4 km || 
|-id=097 bgcolor=#d6d6d6
| 273097 ||  || — || March 21, 2006 || Mount Lemmon || Mount Lemmon Survey || — || align=right | 3.5 km || 
|-id=098 bgcolor=#E9E9E9
| 273098 ||  || — || March 23, 2006 || Mount Lemmon || Mount Lemmon Survey || — || align=right | 3.0 km || 
|-id=099 bgcolor=#d6d6d6
| 273099 ||  || — || March 23, 2006 || Kitt Peak || Spacewatch || — || align=right | 4.1 km || 
|-id=100 bgcolor=#d6d6d6
| 273100 ||  || — || March 23, 2006 || Kitt Peak || Spacewatch || — || align=right | 3.3 km || 
|}

273101–273200 

|-bgcolor=#E9E9E9
| 273101 ||  || — || March 23, 2006 || Mount Lemmon || Mount Lemmon Survey || — || align=right | 2.7 km || 
|-id=102 bgcolor=#d6d6d6
| 273102 ||  || — || March 23, 2006 || Mount Lemmon || Mount Lemmon Survey || — || align=right | 3.1 km || 
|-id=103 bgcolor=#d6d6d6
| 273103 ||  || — || March 23, 2006 || Mount Lemmon || Mount Lemmon Survey || — || align=right | 2.9 km || 
|-id=104 bgcolor=#d6d6d6
| 273104 ||  || — || March 23, 2006 || Kitt Peak || Spacewatch || THM || align=right | 3.0 km || 
|-id=105 bgcolor=#d6d6d6
| 273105 ||  || — || March 24, 2006 || Kitt Peak || Spacewatch || — || align=right | 4.1 km || 
|-id=106 bgcolor=#d6d6d6
| 273106 ||  || — || March 24, 2006 || Mount Lemmon || Mount Lemmon Survey || — || align=right | 3.6 km || 
|-id=107 bgcolor=#d6d6d6
| 273107 ||  || — || March 24, 2006 || Mount Lemmon || Mount Lemmon Survey || — || align=right | 3.8 km || 
|-id=108 bgcolor=#d6d6d6
| 273108 ||  || — || March 24, 2006 || Mount Lemmon || Mount Lemmon Survey || — || align=right | 3.6 km || 
|-id=109 bgcolor=#d6d6d6
| 273109 ||  || — || March 24, 2006 || Mount Lemmon || Mount Lemmon Survey || EOS || align=right | 3.7 km || 
|-id=110 bgcolor=#d6d6d6
| 273110 ||  || — || March 24, 2006 || Mount Lemmon || Mount Lemmon Survey || THM || align=right | 2.5 km || 
|-id=111 bgcolor=#d6d6d6
| 273111 ||  || — || March 24, 2006 || Mount Lemmon || Mount Lemmon Survey || THM || align=right | 2.7 km || 
|-id=112 bgcolor=#d6d6d6
| 273112 ||  || — || March 25, 2006 || Kitt Peak || Spacewatch || — || align=right | 3.8 km || 
|-id=113 bgcolor=#d6d6d6
| 273113 ||  || — || March 25, 2006 || Kitt Peak || Spacewatch || — || align=right | 3.2 km || 
|-id=114 bgcolor=#d6d6d6
| 273114 ||  || — || March 22, 2006 || Catalina || CSS || — || align=right | 5.4 km || 
|-id=115 bgcolor=#E9E9E9
| 273115 ||  || — || March 24, 2006 || Kitt Peak || Spacewatch || AGN || align=right | 1.9 km || 
|-id=116 bgcolor=#d6d6d6
| 273116 ||  || — || March 25, 2006 || Kitt Peak || Spacewatch || — || align=right | 3.3 km || 
|-id=117 bgcolor=#d6d6d6
| 273117 ||  || — || March 26, 2006 || Mount Lemmon || Mount Lemmon Survey || — || align=right | 3.1 km || 
|-id=118 bgcolor=#E9E9E9
| 273118 ||  || — || March 29, 2006 || Kitt Peak || Spacewatch || — || align=right | 2.8 km || 
|-id=119 bgcolor=#d6d6d6
| 273119 ||  || — || March 25, 2006 || Kitt Peak || Spacewatch || HYG || align=right | 3.4 km || 
|-id=120 bgcolor=#d6d6d6
| 273120 ||  || — || March 25, 2006 || Kitt Peak || Spacewatch || — || align=right | 2.5 km || 
|-id=121 bgcolor=#d6d6d6
| 273121 ||  || — || March 23, 2006 || Mount Lemmon || Mount Lemmon Survey || EOS || align=right | 2.1 km || 
|-id=122 bgcolor=#d6d6d6
| 273122 ||  || — || March 24, 2006 || Kitt Peak || Spacewatch || — || align=right | 3.5 km || 
|-id=123 bgcolor=#d6d6d6
| 273123 ||  || — || April 2, 2006 || Kitt Peak || Spacewatch || — || align=right | 2.9 km || 
|-id=124 bgcolor=#d6d6d6
| 273124 ||  || — || April 2, 2006 || Kitt Peak || Spacewatch || — || align=right | 3.7 km || 
|-id=125 bgcolor=#d6d6d6
| 273125 ||  || — || April 2, 2006 || Kitt Peak || Spacewatch || EOS || align=right | 2.7 km || 
|-id=126 bgcolor=#d6d6d6
| 273126 ||  || — || April 2, 2006 || Kitt Peak || Spacewatch || — || align=right | 3.5 km || 
|-id=127 bgcolor=#d6d6d6
| 273127 ||  || — || April 2, 2006 || Kitt Peak || Spacewatch || — || align=right | 3.8 km || 
|-id=128 bgcolor=#d6d6d6
| 273128 ||  || — || April 2, 2006 || Kitt Peak || Spacewatch || — || align=right | 2.5 km || 
|-id=129 bgcolor=#d6d6d6
| 273129 ||  || — || April 2, 2006 || Mount Lemmon || Mount Lemmon Survey || KOR || align=right | 1.7 km || 
|-id=130 bgcolor=#d6d6d6
| 273130 ||  || — || April 2, 2006 || Kitt Peak || Spacewatch || — || align=right | 2.9 km || 
|-id=131 bgcolor=#d6d6d6
| 273131 ||  || — || April 2, 2006 || Mount Lemmon || Mount Lemmon Survey || — || align=right | 2.9 km || 
|-id=132 bgcolor=#d6d6d6
| 273132 ||  || — || April 7, 2006 || Kitt Peak || Spacewatch || — || align=right | 3.7 km || 
|-id=133 bgcolor=#fefefe
| 273133 ||  || — || April 8, 2006 || Catalina || CSS || H || align=right data-sort-value="0.80" | 800 m || 
|-id=134 bgcolor=#d6d6d6
| 273134 ||  || — || April 8, 2006 || Kitt Peak || Spacewatch || — || align=right | 5.5 km || 
|-id=135 bgcolor=#d6d6d6
| 273135 ||  || — || April 9, 2006 || Kitt Peak || Spacewatch || — || align=right | 3.9 km || 
|-id=136 bgcolor=#d6d6d6
| 273136 ||  || — || April 9, 2006 || Kitt Peak || Spacewatch || — || align=right | 4.1 km || 
|-id=137 bgcolor=#d6d6d6
| 273137 ||  || — || April 2, 2006 || Anderson Mesa || LONEOS || — || align=right | 5.0 km || 
|-id=138 bgcolor=#d6d6d6
| 273138 ||  || — || April 18, 2006 || Kitt Peak || Spacewatch || KAR || align=right | 1.3 km || 
|-id=139 bgcolor=#d6d6d6
| 273139 ||  || — || April 18, 2006 || Kitt Peak || Spacewatch || HYG || align=right | 3.0 km || 
|-id=140 bgcolor=#d6d6d6
| 273140 ||  || — || April 19, 2006 || Kitt Peak || Spacewatch || — || align=right | 4.0 km || 
|-id=141 bgcolor=#E9E9E9
| 273141 ||  || — || April 19, 2006 || Palomar || NEAT || — || align=right | 3.7 km || 
|-id=142 bgcolor=#d6d6d6
| 273142 ||  || — || April 19, 2006 || Mount Lemmon || Mount Lemmon Survey || — || align=right | 3.4 km || 
|-id=143 bgcolor=#d6d6d6
| 273143 ||  || — || April 18, 2006 || Kitt Peak || Spacewatch || — || align=right | 3.0 km || 
|-id=144 bgcolor=#d6d6d6
| 273144 ||  || — || April 19, 2006 || Mount Lemmon || Mount Lemmon Survey || — || align=right | 3.3 km || 
|-id=145 bgcolor=#d6d6d6
| 273145 ||  || — || April 20, 2006 || Kitt Peak || Spacewatch || — || align=right | 3.0 km || 
|-id=146 bgcolor=#d6d6d6
| 273146 ||  || — || April 20, 2006 || Kitt Peak || Spacewatch || — || align=right | 2.8 km || 
|-id=147 bgcolor=#d6d6d6
| 273147 ||  || — || April 20, 2006 || Kitt Peak || Spacewatch || LUT || align=right | 5.2 km || 
|-id=148 bgcolor=#d6d6d6
| 273148 ||  || — || April 21, 2006 || Catalina || CSS || — || align=right | 3.3 km || 
|-id=149 bgcolor=#d6d6d6
| 273149 ||  || — || April 23, 2006 || Socorro || LINEAR || — || align=right | 6.0 km || 
|-id=150 bgcolor=#d6d6d6
| 273150 ||  || — || April 19, 2006 || Kitt Peak || Spacewatch || — || align=right | 3.8 km || 
|-id=151 bgcolor=#d6d6d6
| 273151 ||  || — || April 19, 2006 || Mount Lemmon || Mount Lemmon Survey || — || align=right | 3.4 km || 
|-id=152 bgcolor=#d6d6d6
| 273152 ||  || — || April 19, 2006 || Catalina || CSS || — || align=right | 4.5 km || 
|-id=153 bgcolor=#d6d6d6
| 273153 ||  || — || April 21, 2006 || Kitt Peak || Spacewatch || — || align=right | 4.0 km || 
|-id=154 bgcolor=#d6d6d6
| 273154 ||  || — || April 21, 2006 || Kitt Peak || Spacewatch || EOS || align=right | 1.9 km || 
|-id=155 bgcolor=#d6d6d6
| 273155 ||  || — || April 21, 2006 || Kitt Peak || Spacewatch || — || align=right | 6.0 km || 
|-id=156 bgcolor=#d6d6d6
| 273156 ||  || — || April 21, 2006 || Kitt Peak || Spacewatch || — || align=right | 3.7 km || 
|-id=157 bgcolor=#d6d6d6
| 273157 ||  || — || April 24, 2006 || Mount Lemmon || Mount Lemmon Survey || — || align=right | 3.2 km || 
|-id=158 bgcolor=#E9E9E9
| 273158 ||  || — || April 25, 2006 || Kitt Peak || Spacewatch || — || align=right | 2.7 km || 
|-id=159 bgcolor=#d6d6d6
| 273159 ||  || — || April 20, 2006 || Catalina || CSS || — || align=right | 4.2 km || 
|-id=160 bgcolor=#d6d6d6
| 273160 ||  || — || April 21, 2006 || Catalina || CSS || — || align=right | 4.2 km || 
|-id=161 bgcolor=#d6d6d6
| 273161 ||  || — || April 22, 2006 || Siding Spring || SSS || — || align=right | 4.4 km || 
|-id=162 bgcolor=#d6d6d6
| 273162 ||  || — || April 26, 2006 || Anderson Mesa || LONEOS || EUP || align=right | 6.8 km || 
|-id=163 bgcolor=#d6d6d6
| 273163 ||  || — || April 28, 2006 || Socorro || LINEAR || — || align=right | 5.0 km || 
|-id=164 bgcolor=#d6d6d6
| 273164 ||  || — || April 29, 2006 || Catalina || CSS || — || align=right | 4.4 km || 
|-id=165 bgcolor=#d6d6d6
| 273165 ||  || — || April 24, 2006 || Kitt Peak || Spacewatch || — || align=right | 3.4 km || 
|-id=166 bgcolor=#d6d6d6
| 273166 ||  || — || April 24, 2006 || Kitt Peak || Spacewatch || — || align=right | 2.6 km || 
|-id=167 bgcolor=#d6d6d6
| 273167 ||  || — || April 24, 2006 || Kitt Peak || Spacewatch || EOS || align=right | 2.7 km || 
|-id=168 bgcolor=#d6d6d6
| 273168 ||  || — || April 24, 2006 || Kitt Peak || Spacewatch || — || align=right | 3.2 km || 
|-id=169 bgcolor=#d6d6d6
| 273169 ||  || — || April 24, 2006 || Mount Lemmon || Mount Lemmon Survey || THM || align=right | 2.5 km || 
|-id=170 bgcolor=#d6d6d6
| 273170 ||  || — || April 25, 2006 || Kitt Peak || Spacewatch || — || align=right | 3.2 km || 
|-id=171 bgcolor=#d6d6d6
| 273171 ||  || — || April 25, 2006 || Kitt Peak || Spacewatch || — || align=right | 3.5 km || 
|-id=172 bgcolor=#d6d6d6
| 273172 ||  || — || April 25, 2006 || Kitt Peak || Spacewatch || — || align=right | 3.2 km || 
|-id=173 bgcolor=#d6d6d6
| 273173 ||  || — || April 25, 2006 || Kitt Peak || Spacewatch || EOS || align=right | 2.6 km || 
|-id=174 bgcolor=#d6d6d6
| 273174 ||  || — || April 25, 2006 || Kitt Peak || Spacewatch || LIX || align=right | 4.2 km || 
|-id=175 bgcolor=#d6d6d6
| 273175 ||  || — || April 25, 2006 || Kitt Peak || Spacewatch || EOS || align=right | 2.5 km || 
|-id=176 bgcolor=#d6d6d6
| 273176 ||  || — || April 26, 2006 || Kitt Peak || Spacewatch || — || align=right | 2.9 km || 
|-id=177 bgcolor=#d6d6d6
| 273177 ||  || — || April 26, 2006 || Kitt Peak || Spacewatch || — || align=right | 5.0 km || 
|-id=178 bgcolor=#d6d6d6
| 273178 ||  || — || April 26, 2006 || Kitt Peak || Spacewatch || TIR || align=right | 4.7 km || 
|-id=179 bgcolor=#d6d6d6
| 273179 ||  || — || April 26, 2006 || Kitt Peak || Spacewatch || — || align=right | 5.8 km || 
|-id=180 bgcolor=#d6d6d6
| 273180 ||  || — || April 29, 2006 || Kitt Peak || Spacewatch || EOS || align=right | 2.6 km || 
|-id=181 bgcolor=#d6d6d6
| 273181 ||  || — || April 29, 2006 || Kitt Peak || Spacewatch || — || align=right | 3.3 km || 
|-id=182 bgcolor=#d6d6d6
| 273182 ||  || — || April 29, 2006 || Kitt Peak || Spacewatch || EOS || align=right | 4.7 km || 
|-id=183 bgcolor=#d6d6d6
| 273183 ||  || — || April 30, 2006 || Kitt Peak || Spacewatch || — || align=right | 2.2 km || 
|-id=184 bgcolor=#d6d6d6
| 273184 ||  || — || April 30, 2006 || Kitt Peak || Spacewatch || — || align=right | 2.7 km || 
|-id=185 bgcolor=#fefefe
| 273185 ||  || — || April 30, 2006 || Kitt Peak || Spacewatch || H || align=right | 1.0 km || 
|-id=186 bgcolor=#d6d6d6
| 273186 ||  || — || April 30, 2006 || Kitt Peak || Spacewatch || EOS || align=right | 3.7 km || 
|-id=187 bgcolor=#d6d6d6
| 273187 ||  || — || April 30, 2006 || Kitt Peak || Spacewatch || — || align=right | 4.0 km || 
|-id=188 bgcolor=#d6d6d6
| 273188 ||  || — || April 30, 2006 || Kitt Peak || Spacewatch || — || align=right | 3.7 km || 
|-id=189 bgcolor=#d6d6d6
| 273189 ||  || — || April 30, 2006 || Kitt Peak || Spacewatch || — || align=right | 4.4 km || 
|-id=190 bgcolor=#d6d6d6
| 273190 ||  || — || April 30, 2006 || Catalina || CSS || — || align=right | 3.4 km || 
|-id=191 bgcolor=#d6d6d6
| 273191 ||  || — || April 26, 2006 || Kitt Peak || Spacewatch || HYG || align=right | 2.9 km || 
|-id=192 bgcolor=#d6d6d6
| 273192 ||  || — || April 30, 2006 || Kitt Peak || Spacewatch || — || align=right | 2.9 km || 
|-id=193 bgcolor=#d6d6d6
| 273193 ||  || — || April 30, 2006 || Kitt Peak || Spacewatch || — || align=right | 3.2 km || 
|-id=194 bgcolor=#E9E9E9
| 273194 ||  || — || April 26, 2006 || Cerro Tololo || M. W. Buie || HOF || align=right | 3.2 km || 
|-id=195 bgcolor=#d6d6d6
| 273195 ||  || — || April 30, 2006 || Anderson Mesa || LONEOS || TRE || align=right | 3.9 km || 
|-id=196 bgcolor=#d6d6d6
| 273196 ||  || — || April 24, 2006 || Mount Lemmon || Mount Lemmon Survey || THM || align=right | 2.7 km || 
|-id=197 bgcolor=#fefefe
| 273197 ||  || — || May 2, 2006 || Catalina || CSS || H || align=right | 1.0 km || 
|-id=198 bgcolor=#d6d6d6
| 273198 ||  || — || May 2, 2006 || Mount Lemmon || Mount Lemmon Survey || — || align=right | 2.8 km || 
|-id=199 bgcolor=#fefefe
| 273199 ||  || — || May 3, 2006 || Mount Lemmon || Mount Lemmon Survey || H || align=right data-sort-value="0.95" | 950 m || 
|-id=200 bgcolor=#d6d6d6
| 273200 ||  || — || May 1, 2006 || Kitt Peak || Spacewatch || — || align=right | 3.8 km || 
|}

273201–273300 

|-bgcolor=#d6d6d6
| 273201 ||  || — || May 1, 2006 || Kitt Peak || Spacewatch || — || align=right | 3.8 km || 
|-id=202 bgcolor=#d6d6d6
| 273202 ||  || — || May 1, 2006 || Kitt Peak || Spacewatch || — || align=right | 5.3 km || 
|-id=203 bgcolor=#d6d6d6
| 273203 ||  || — || May 3, 2006 || Kitt Peak || Spacewatch || — || align=right | 4.7 km || 
|-id=204 bgcolor=#d6d6d6
| 273204 ||  || — || May 2, 2006 || Mount Lemmon || Mount Lemmon Survey || KAR || align=right | 1.4 km || 
|-id=205 bgcolor=#d6d6d6
| 273205 ||  || — || May 2, 2006 || Mount Lemmon || Mount Lemmon Survey || — || align=right | 3.6 km || 
|-id=206 bgcolor=#d6d6d6
| 273206 ||  || — || May 2, 2006 || Kitt Peak || Spacewatch || EOS || align=right | 1.8 km || 
|-id=207 bgcolor=#d6d6d6
| 273207 ||  || — || May 2, 2006 || Kitt Peak || Spacewatch || — || align=right | 4.9 km || 
|-id=208 bgcolor=#d6d6d6
| 273208 ||  || — || May 2, 2006 || Kitt Peak || Spacewatch || — || align=right | 3.7 km || 
|-id=209 bgcolor=#d6d6d6
| 273209 ||  || — || May 2, 2006 || Mount Lemmon || Mount Lemmon Survey || EOS || align=right | 2.4 km || 
|-id=210 bgcolor=#d6d6d6
| 273210 ||  || — || May 2, 2006 || Kitt Peak || Spacewatch || — || align=right | 3.3 km || 
|-id=211 bgcolor=#d6d6d6
| 273211 ||  || — || May 4, 2006 || Mount Lemmon || Mount Lemmon Survey || — || align=right | 3.9 km || 
|-id=212 bgcolor=#d6d6d6
| 273212 ||  || — || May 3, 2006 || Kitt Peak || Spacewatch || — || align=right | 3.9 km || 
|-id=213 bgcolor=#d6d6d6
| 273213 ||  || — || May 3, 2006 || Kitt Peak || Spacewatch || KOR || align=right | 1.9 km || 
|-id=214 bgcolor=#d6d6d6
| 273214 ||  || — || May 3, 2006 || Kitt Peak || Spacewatch || — || align=right | 3.9 km || 
|-id=215 bgcolor=#d6d6d6
| 273215 ||  || — || May 4, 2006 || Kitt Peak || Spacewatch || — || align=right | 2.7 km || 
|-id=216 bgcolor=#d6d6d6
| 273216 ||  || — || May 4, 2006 || Kitt Peak || Spacewatch || — || align=right | 3.9 km || 
|-id=217 bgcolor=#d6d6d6
| 273217 ||  || — || May 5, 2006 || Kitt Peak || Spacewatch || BRA || align=right | 1.7 km || 
|-id=218 bgcolor=#d6d6d6
| 273218 ||  || — || May 5, 2006 || Mount Lemmon || Mount Lemmon Survey || — || align=right | 3.6 km || 
|-id=219 bgcolor=#d6d6d6
| 273219 ||  || — || May 5, 2006 || Anderson Mesa || LONEOS || TIR || align=right | 4.8 km || 
|-id=220 bgcolor=#d6d6d6
| 273220 ||  || — || May 7, 2006 || Kitt Peak || Spacewatch || — || align=right | 4.4 km || 
|-id=221 bgcolor=#d6d6d6
| 273221 ||  || — || May 7, 2006 || Kitt Peak || Spacewatch || — || align=right | 4.2 km || 
|-id=222 bgcolor=#d6d6d6
| 273222 ||  || — || May 1, 2006 || Kitt Peak || Spacewatch || — || align=right | 3.0 km || 
|-id=223 bgcolor=#d6d6d6
| 273223 ||  || — || May 3, 2006 || Kitt Peak || Spacewatch || — || align=right | 3.2 km || 
|-id=224 bgcolor=#d6d6d6
| 273224 ||  || — || May 8, 2006 || Mount Lemmon || Mount Lemmon Survey || TIR || align=right | 4.0 km || 
|-id=225 bgcolor=#d6d6d6
| 273225 ||  || — || May 9, 2006 || Mount Lemmon || Mount Lemmon Survey || — || align=right | 3.5 km || 
|-id=226 bgcolor=#d6d6d6
| 273226 ||  || — || May 1, 2006 || Catalina || CSS || — || align=right | 4.8 km || 
|-id=227 bgcolor=#d6d6d6
| 273227 ||  || — || May 2, 2006 || Kitt Peak || M. W. Buie || — || align=right | 3.0 km || 
|-id=228 bgcolor=#d6d6d6
| 273228 ||  || — || May 1, 2006 || Kitt Peak || M. W. Buie || — || align=right | 3.3 km || 
|-id=229 bgcolor=#d6d6d6
| 273229 ||  || — || May 1, 2006 || Kitt Peak || M. W. Buie || EOS || align=right | 2.3 km || 
|-id=230 bgcolor=#d6d6d6
| 273230 de Bruyn ||  ||  || May 1, 2006 || Mauna Kea || P. A. Wiegert || TEL || align=right | 1.8 km || 
|-id=231 bgcolor=#d6d6d6
| 273231 ||  || — || May 1, 2006 || Kitt Peak || Spacewatch || — || align=right | 3.3 km || 
|-id=232 bgcolor=#d6d6d6
| 273232 ||  || — || May 16, 2006 || Palomar || NEAT || — || align=right | 5.1 km || 
|-id=233 bgcolor=#d6d6d6
| 273233 ||  || — || May 20, 2006 || Mayhill || A. Lowe || LIX || align=right | 5.7 km || 
|-id=234 bgcolor=#d6d6d6
| 273234 ||  || — || May 20, 2006 || Kitt Peak || Spacewatch || — || align=right | 5.3 km || 
|-id=235 bgcolor=#d6d6d6
| 273235 ||  || — || May 20, 2006 || Kitt Peak || Spacewatch || — || align=right | 3.8 km || 
|-id=236 bgcolor=#d6d6d6
| 273236 ||  || — || May 20, 2006 || Kitt Peak || Spacewatch || THM || align=right | 2.7 km || 
|-id=237 bgcolor=#d6d6d6
| 273237 ||  || — || May 20, 2006 || Anderson Mesa || LONEOS || — || align=right | 5.1 km || 
|-id=238 bgcolor=#d6d6d6
| 273238 ||  || — || May 20, 2006 || Kitt Peak || Spacewatch || AEG || align=right | 4.4 km || 
|-id=239 bgcolor=#d6d6d6
| 273239 ||  || — || May 20, 2006 || Kitt Peak || Spacewatch || 7:4 || align=right | 5.9 km || 
|-id=240 bgcolor=#d6d6d6
| 273240 ||  || — || May 20, 2006 || Kitt Peak || Spacewatch || — || align=right | 4.8 km || 
|-id=241 bgcolor=#d6d6d6
| 273241 ||  || — || May 20, 2006 || Kitt Peak || Spacewatch || — || align=right | 7.2 km || 
|-id=242 bgcolor=#d6d6d6
| 273242 ||  || — || May 19, 2006 || Catalina || CSS || — || align=right | 4.6 km || 
|-id=243 bgcolor=#d6d6d6
| 273243 ||  || — || May 19, 2006 || Mount Lemmon || Mount Lemmon Survey || — || align=right | 3.6 km || 
|-id=244 bgcolor=#d6d6d6
| 273244 ||  || — || May 20, 2006 || Kitt Peak || Spacewatch || HYG || align=right | 3.2 km || 
|-id=245 bgcolor=#d6d6d6
| 273245 ||  || — || May 21, 2006 || Kitt Peak || Spacewatch || — || align=right | 3.8 km || 
|-id=246 bgcolor=#d6d6d6
| 273246 ||  || — || May 21, 2006 || Kitt Peak || Spacewatch || — || align=right | 4.5 km || 
|-id=247 bgcolor=#d6d6d6
| 273247 ||  || — || May 22, 2006 || Kitt Peak || Spacewatch || — || align=right | 4.5 km || 
|-id=248 bgcolor=#d6d6d6
| 273248 ||  || — || May 24, 2006 || Mount Lemmon || Mount Lemmon Survey || HYG || align=right | 2.9 km || 
|-id=249 bgcolor=#d6d6d6
| 273249 ||  || — || May 24, 2006 || Mount Lemmon || Mount Lemmon Survey || — || align=right | 4.5 km || 
|-id=250 bgcolor=#d6d6d6
| 273250 ||  || — || May 23, 2006 || Kitt Peak || Spacewatch || EOS || align=right | 2.2 km || 
|-id=251 bgcolor=#d6d6d6
| 273251 ||  || — || May 25, 2006 || Mount Lemmon || Mount Lemmon Survey || — || align=right | 5.0 km || 
|-id=252 bgcolor=#d6d6d6
| 273252 ||  || — || May 24, 2006 || Kitt Peak || Spacewatch || — || align=right | 2.6 km || 
|-id=253 bgcolor=#d6d6d6
| 273253 ||  || — || May 25, 2006 || Kitt Peak || Spacewatch || — || align=right | 3.0 km || 
|-id=254 bgcolor=#d6d6d6
| 273254 ||  || — || May 29, 2006 || Kitt Peak || Spacewatch || — || align=right | 5.0 km || 
|-id=255 bgcolor=#d6d6d6
| 273255 ||  || — || May 31, 2006 || Mount Lemmon || Mount Lemmon Survey || — || align=right | 3.2 km || 
|-id=256 bgcolor=#d6d6d6
| 273256 ||  || — || May 31, 2006 || Mount Lemmon || Mount Lemmon Survey || EOS || align=right | 2.7 km || 
|-id=257 bgcolor=#d6d6d6
| 273257 ||  || — || May 29, 2006 || Kitt Peak || Spacewatch || — || align=right | 2.6 km || 
|-id=258 bgcolor=#d6d6d6
| 273258 ||  || — || May 29, 2006 || Kitt Peak || Spacewatch || — || align=right | 4.2 km || 
|-id=259 bgcolor=#d6d6d6
| 273259 ||  || — || May 29, 2006 || Kitt Peak || Spacewatch || — || align=right | 3.3 km || 
|-id=260 bgcolor=#d6d6d6
| 273260 ||  || — || May 29, 2006 || Kitt Peak || Spacewatch || — || align=right | 4.4 km || 
|-id=261 bgcolor=#d6d6d6
| 273261 ||  || — || May 29, 2006 || Reedy Creek || J. Broughton || — || align=right | 4.8 km || 
|-id=262 bgcolor=#d6d6d6
| 273262 Cottam ||  ||  || May 25, 2006 || Mauna Kea || P. A. Wiegert || — || align=right | 4.1 km || 
|-id=263 bgcolor=#d6d6d6
| 273263 ||  || — || May 18, 2006 || Palomar || NEAT || — || align=right | 4.3 km || 
|-id=264 bgcolor=#FA8072
| 273264 ||  || — || June 3, 2006 || Mount Lemmon || Mount Lemmon Survey || — || align=right data-sort-value="0.59" | 590 m || 
|-id=265 bgcolor=#d6d6d6
| 273265 ||  || — || June 5, 2006 || Socorro || LINEAR || — || align=right | 4.9 km || 
|-id=266 bgcolor=#fefefe
| 273266 ||  || — || June 4, 2006 || Mount Lemmon || Mount Lemmon Survey || V || align=right data-sort-value="0.69" | 690 m || 
|-id=267 bgcolor=#d6d6d6
| 273267 ||  || — || June 16, 2006 || Kitt Peak || Spacewatch || — || align=right | 4.2 km || 
|-id=268 bgcolor=#d6d6d6
| 273268 ||  || — || June 18, 2006 || Kitt Peak || Spacewatch || EOS || align=right | 2.2 km || 
|-id=269 bgcolor=#d6d6d6
| 273269 ||  || — || June 16, 2006 || Kitt Peak || Spacewatch || — || align=right | 2.8 km || 
|-id=270 bgcolor=#d6d6d6
| 273270 ||  || — || June 18, 2006 || Kitt Peak || Spacewatch || URS || align=right | 4.5 km || 
|-id=271 bgcolor=#d6d6d6
| 273271 ||  || — || July 17, 2006 || Reedy Creek || J. Broughton || EUP || align=right | 6.0 km || 
|-id=272 bgcolor=#fefefe
| 273272 || 2006 OU || — || July 17, 2006 || Lulin Observatory || LUSS || NYS || align=right data-sort-value="0.90" | 900 m || 
|-id=273 bgcolor=#d6d6d6
| 273273 Piwowarski ||  ||  || July 24, 2006 || Winterthur || M. Griesser || Tj (2.89) || align=right | 3.9 km || 
|-id=274 bgcolor=#E9E9E9
| 273274 ||  || — || August 12, 2006 || Palomar || NEAT || ADE || align=right | 2.1 km || 
|-id=275 bgcolor=#fefefe
| 273275 ||  || — || August 12, 2006 || Palomar || NEAT || H || align=right data-sort-value="0.92" | 920 m || 
|-id=276 bgcolor=#fefefe
| 273276 ||  || — || August 25, 2006 || Socorro || LINEAR || FLO || align=right data-sort-value="0.92" | 920 m || 
|-id=277 bgcolor=#fefefe
| 273277 ||  || — || August 21, 2006 || Kitt Peak || Spacewatch || V || align=right data-sort-value="0.78" | 780 m || 
|-id=278 bgcolor=#fefefe
| 273278 ||  || — || August 28, 2006 || Catalina || CSS || — || align=right | 1.1 km || 
|-id=279 bgcolor=#fefefe
| 273279 ||  || — || August 28, 2006 || Socorro || LINEAR || — || align=right data-sort-value="0.73" | 730 m || 
|-id=280 bgcolor=#fefefe
| 273280 ||  || — || August 18, 2006 || Palomar || NEAT || — || align=right data-sort-value="0.78" | 780 m || 
|-id=281 bgcolor=#fefefe
| 273281 ||  || — || August 29, 2006 || Catalina || CSS || V || align=right data-sort-value="0.75" | 750 m || 
|-id=282 bgcolor=#fefefe
| 273282 ||  || — || August 30, 2006 || Socorro || LINEAR || — || align=right | 1.2 km || 
|-id=283 bgcolor=#d6d6d6
| 273283 ||  || — || September 14, 2006 || Catalina || CSS || SHU3:2 || align=right | 8.9 km || 
|-id=284 bgcolor=#fefefe
| 273284 ||  || — || September 14, 2006 || Kitt Peak || Spacewatch || — || align=right data-sort-value="0.63" | 630 m || 
|-id=285 bgcolor=#fefefe
| 273285 ||  || — || September 15, 2006 || Kitt Peak || Spacewatch || — || align=right | 1.0 km || 
|-id=286 bgcolor=#fefefe
| 273286 ||  || — || September 14, 2006 || Kitt Peak || Spacewatch || FLO || align=right data-sort-value="0.84" | 840 m || 
|-id=287 bgcolor=#fefefe
| 273287 ||  || — || September 15, 2006 || Kitt Peak || Spacewatch || — || align=right data-sort-value="0.66" | 660 m || 
|-id=288 bgcolor=#fefefe
| 273288 ||  || — || September 15, 2006 || Kitt Peak || Spacewatch || — || align=right data-sort-value="0.55" | 550 m || 
|-id=289 bgcolor=#fefefe
| 273289 ||  || — || September 14, 2006 || Catalina || CSS || — || align=right | 1.3 km || 
|-id=290 bgcolor=#FA8072
| 273290 ||  || — || September 16, 2006 || Anderson Mesa || LONEOS || — || align=right data-sort-value="0.88" | 880 m || 
|-id=291 bgcolor=#d6d6d6
| 273291 ||  || — || September 17, 2006 || Kitt Peak || Spacewatch || — || align=right | 4.0 km || 
|-id=292 bgcolor=#FA8072
| 273292 ||  || — || September 17, 2006 || Anderson Mesa || LONEOS || — || align=right | 1.1 km || 
|-id=293 bgcolor=#fefefe
| 273293 ||  || — || September 18, 2006 || Catalina || CSS || FLO || align=right data-sort-value="0.75" | 750 m || 
|-id=294 bgcolor=#fefefe
| 273294 ||  || — || September 19, 2006 || Kitt Peak || Spacewatch || — || align=right data-sort-value="0.66" | 660 m || 
|-id=295 bgcolor=#fefefe
| 273295 ||  || — || September 18, 2006 || Kitt Peak || Spacewatch || — || align=right data-sort-value="0.81" | 810 m || 
|-id=296 bgcolor=#fefefe
| 273296 ||  || — || September 18, 2006 || Kitt Peak || Spacewatch || NYS || align=right data-sort-value="0.64" | 640 m || 
|-id=297 bgcolor=#fefefe
| 273297 ||  || — || September 18, 2006 || Kitt Peak || Spacewatch || — || align=right data-sort-value="0.76" | 760 m || 
|-id=298 bgcolor=#fefefe
| 273298 ||  || — || September 19, 2006 || Kitt Peak || Spacewatch || — || align=right | 1.0 km || 
|-id=299 bgcolor=#fefefe
| 273299 ||  || — || September 19, 2006 || Kitt Peak || Spacewatch || — || align=right data-sort-value="0.69" | 690 m || 
|-id=300 bgcolor=#E9E9E9
| 273300 ||  || — || September 19, 2006 || Catalina || CSS || — || align=right | 1.1 km || 
|}

273301–273400 

|-bgcolor=#fefefe
| 273301 ||  || — || September 23, 2006 || Kitt Peak || Spacewatch || — || align=right data-sort-value="0.83" | 830 m || 
|-id=302 bgcolor=#fefefe
| 273302 ||  || — || September 24, 2006 || Junk Bond || D. Healy || — || align=right data-sort-value="0.87" | 870 m || 
|-id=303 bgcolor=#fefefe
| 273303 ||  || — || September 25, 2006 || Anderson Mesa || LONEOS || V || align=right data-sort-value="0.82" | 820 m || 
|-id=304 bgcolor=#fefefe
| 273304 ||  || — || September 19, 2006 || Kitt Peak || Spacewatch || — || align=right data-sort-value="0.59" | 590 m || 
|-id=305 bgcolor=#fefefe
| 273305 ||  || — || September 25, 2006 || Mount Lemmon || Mount Lemmon Survey || NYS || align=right data-sort-value="0.62" | 620 m || 
|-id=306 bgcolor=#fefefe
| 273306 ||  || — || September 25, 2006 || Mount Lemmon || Mount Lemmon Survey || — || align=right | 1.0 km || 
|-id=307 bgcolor=#fefefe
| 273307 ||  || — || September 24, 2006 || Kitt Peak || Spacewatch || — || align=right data-sort-value="0.65" | 650 m || 
|-id=308 bgcolor=#fefefe
| 273308 ||  || — || September 27, 2006 || Socorro || LINEAR || — || align=right data-sort-value="0.70" | 700 m || 
|-id=309 bgcolor=#fefefe
| 273309 ||  || — || September 26, 2006 || Kitt Peak || Spacewatch || — || align=right data-sort-value="0.69" | 690 m || 
|-id=310 bgcolor=#fefefe
| 273310 ||  || — || September 26, 2006 || Kitt Peak || Spacewatch || — || align=right data-sort-value="0.96" | 960 m || 
|-id=311 bgcolor=#fefefe
| 273311 ||  || — || September 26, 2006 || Kitt Peak || Spacewatch || FLO || align=right data-sort-value="0.62" | 620 m || 
|-id=312 bgcolor=#fefefe
| 273312 ||  || — || September 27, 2006 || Mount Lemmon || Mount Lemmon Survey || FLO || align=right data-sort-value="0.68" | 680 m || 
|-id=313 bgcolor=#fefefe
| 273313 ||  || — || September 27, 2006 || Mount Lemmon || Mount Lemmon Survey || — || align=right data-sort-value="0.91" | 910 m || 
|-id=314 bgcolor=#FA8072
| 273314 ||  || — || September 30, 2006 || Catalina || CSS || — || align=right data-sort-value="0.61" | 610 m || 
|-id=315 bgcolor=#fefefe
| 273315 ||  || — || September 30, 2006 || Catalina || CSS || — || align=right | 1.2 km || 
|-id=316 bgcolor=#fefefe
| 273316 ||  || — || September 17, 2006 || Kitt Peak || Spacewatch || NYS || align=right data-sort-value="0.59" | 590 m || 
|-id=317 bgcolor=#fefefe
| 273317 ||  || — || September 30, 2006 || Mount Lemmon || Mount Lemmon Survey || FLO || align=right data-sort-value="0.70" | 700 m || 
|-id=318 bgcolor=#fefefe
| 273318 ||  || — || September 18, 2006 || Kitt Peak || Spacewatch || — || align=right data-sort-value="0.77" | 770 m || 
|-id=319 bgcolor=#E9E9E9
| 273319 ||  || — || October 2, 2006 || Mount Lemmon || Mount Lemmon Survey || — || align=right data-sort-value="0.89" | 890 m || 
|-id=320 bgcolor=#fefefe
| 273320 ||  || — || October 11, 2006 || Kitt Peak || Spacewatch || EUT || align=right data-sort-value="0.77" | 770 m || 
|-id=321 bgcolor=#E9E9E9
| 273321 ||  || — || October 11, 2006 || Kitt Peak || Spacewatch || — || align=right data-sort-value="0.98" | 980 m || 
|-id=322 bgcolor=#fefefe
| 273322 ||  || — || October 11, 2006 || Palomar || NEAT || — || align=right data-sort-value="0.94" | 940 m || 
|-id=323 bgcolor=#fefefe
| 273323 ||  || — || October 11, 2006 || Kitt Peak || Spacewatch || FLO || align=right data-sort-value="0.69" | 690 m || 
|-id=324 bgcolor=#fefefe
| 273324 ||  || — || October 12, 2006 || Kitt Peak || Spacewatch || — || align=right data-sort-value="0.69" | 690 m || 
|-id=325 bgcolor=#E9E9E9
| 273325 ||  || — || October 12, 2006 || Kitt Peak || Spacewatch || — || align=right | 1.1 km || 
|-id=326 bgcolor=#E9E9E9
| 273326 ||  || — || October 12, 2006 || Kitt Peak || Spacewatch || — || align=right | 2.2 km || 
|-id=327 bgcolor=#fefefe
| 273327 ||  || — || October 12, 2006 || Kitt Peak || Spacewatch || — || align=right data-sort-value="0.82" | 820 m || 
|-id=328 bgcolor=#fefefe
| 273328 ||  || — || October 12, 2006 || Kitt Peak || Spacewatch || MAS || align=right data-sort-value="0.85" | 850 m || 
|-id=329 bgcolor=#fefefe
| 273329 ||  || — || October 12, 2006 || Palomar || NEAT || fast? || align=right | 1.2 km || 
|-id=330 bgcolor=#fefefe
| 273330 ||  || — || October 15, 2006 || Kitt Peak || Spacewatch || FLO || align=right data-sort-value="0.73" | 730 m || 
|-id=331 bgcolor=#fefefe
| 273331 ||  || — || October 10, 2006 || Palomar || NEAT || FLO || align=right data-sort-value="0.81" | 810 m || 
|-id=332 bgcolor=#fefefe
| 273332 ||  || — || October 10, 2006 || Palomar || NEAT || V || align=right data-sort-value="0.69" | 690 m || 
|-id=333 bgcolor=#fefefe
| 273333 ||  || — || October 11, 2006 || Palomar || NEAT || — || align=right data-sort-value="0.83" | 830 m || 
|-id=334 bgcolor=#fefefe
| 273334 ||  || — || October 11, 2006 || Palomar || NEAT || — || align=right data-sort-value="0.92" | 920 m || 
|-id=335 bgcolor=#fefefe
| 273335 ||  || — || October 11, 2006 || Palomar || NEAT || — || align=right data-sort-value="0.80" | 800 m || 
|-id=336 bgcolor=#E9E9E9
| 273336 ||  || — || October 11, 2006 || Palomar || NEAT || — || align=right | 1.0 km || 
|-id=337 bgcolor=#fefefe
| 273337 ||  || — || October 12, 2006 || Kitt Peak || Spacewatch || — || align=right data-sort-value="0.76" | 760 m || 
|-id=338 bgcolor=#fefefe
| 273338 ||  || — || October 13, 2006 || Kitt Peak || Spacewatch || FLO || align=right data-sort-value="0.79" | 790 m || 
|-id=339 bgcolor=#fefefe
| 273339 ||  || — || October 13, 2006 || Kitt Peak || Spacewatch || — || align=right data-sort-value="0.76" | 760 m || 
|-id=340 bgcolor=#fefefe
| 273340 ||  || — || October 13, 2006 || Kitt Peak || Spacewatch || — || align=right data-sort-value="0.90" | 900 m || 
|-id=341 bgcolor=#fefefe
| 273341 ||  || — || October 15, 2006 || Kitt Peak || Spacewatch || MAS || align=right data-sort-value="0.71" | 710 m || 
|-id=342 bgcolor=#fefefe
| 273342 ||  || — || October 15, 2006 || Catalina || CSS || — || align=right data-sort-value="0.83" | 830 m || 
|-id=343 bgcolor=#E9E9E9
| 273343 ||  || — || October 13, 2006 || Lulin Observatory || C.-S. Lin, Q.-z. Ye || — || align=right | 1.0 km || 
|-id=344 bgcolor=#E9E9E9
| 273344 ||  || — || October 17, 2006 || Mount Lemmon || Mount Lemmon Survey || — || align=right | 1.3 km || 
|-id=345 bgcolor=#fefefe
| 273345 ||  || — || October 16, 2006 || Kitt Peak || Spacewatch || — || align=right data-sort-value="0.70" | 700 m || 
|-id=346 bgcolor=#fefefe
| 273346 ||  || — || October 16, 2006 || Kitt Peak || Spacewatch || — || align=right data-sort-value="0.62" | 620 m || 
|-id=347 bgcolor=#fefefe
| 273347 ||  || — || October 16, 2006 || Kitt Peak || Spacewatch || — || align=right data-sort-value="0.72" | 720 m || 
|-id=348 bgcolor=#E9E9E9
| 273348 ||  || — || October 19, 2006 || Mount Lemmon || Mount Lemmon Survey || — || align=right | 1.3 km || 
|-id=349 bgcolor=#fefefe
| 273349 ||  || — || October 19, 2006 || Catalina || CSS || FLO || align=right data-sort-value="0.97" | 970 m || 
|-id=350 bgcolor=#fefefe
| 273350 ||  || — || October 16, 2006 || Mount Lemmon || Mount Lemmon Survey || — || align=right data-sort-value="0.68" | 680 m || 
|-id=351 bgcolor=#E9E9E9
| 273351 ||  || — || October 16, 2006 || Kitt Peak || Spacewatch || — || align=right | 1.3 km || 
|-id=352 bgcolor=#E9E9E9
| 273352 ||  || — || October 16, 2006 || Catalina || CSS || — || align=right | 1.3 km || 
|-id=353 bgcolor=#fefefe
| 273353 ||  || — || October 17, 2006 || Kitt Peak || Spacewatch || — || align=right data-sort-value="0.97" | 970 m || 
|-id=354 bgcolor=#fefefe
| 273354 ||  || — || October 17, 2006 || Kitt Peak || Spacewatch || NYS || align=right data-sort-value="0.76" | 760 m || 
|-id=355 bgcolor=#fefefe
| 273355 ||  || — || October 17, 2006 || Kitt Peak || Spacewatch || NYS || align=right data-sort-value="0.76" | 760 m || 
|-id=356 bgcolor=#fefefe
| 273356 ||  || — || October 19, 2006 || Catalina || CSS || — || align=right data-sort-value="0.73" | 730 m || 
|-id=357 bgcolor=#fefefe
| 273357 ||  || — || October 20, 2006 || Kitt Peak || Spacewatch || — || align=right | 1.9 km || 
|-id=358 bgcolor=#fefefe
| 273358 ||  || — || October 22, 2006 || Mount Lemmon || Mount Lemmon Survey || MAS || align=right data-sort-value="0.68" | 680 m || 
|-id=359 bgcolor=#fefefe
| 273359 ||  || — || October 19, 2006 || Catalina || CSS || FLO || align=right data-sort-value="0.71" | 710 m || 
|-id=360 bgcolor=#fefefe
| 273360 ||  || — || October 19, 2006 || Catalina || CSS || — || align=right | 1.3 km || 
|-id=361 bgcolor=#fefefe
| 273361 ||  || — || October 19, 2006 || Catalina || CSS || — || align=right | 1.1 km || 
|-id=362 bgcolor=#fefefe
| 273362 ||  || — || October 19, 2006 || Catalina || CSS || — || align=right data-sort-value="0.78" | 780 m || 
|-id=363 bgcolor=#fefefe
| 273363 ||  || — || October 19, 2006 || Catalina || CSS || FLO || align=right data-sort-value="0.96" | 960 m || 
|-id=364 bgcolor=#FA8072
| 273364 ||  || — || October 23, 2006 || Kitt Peak || Spacewatch || — || align=right data-sort-value="0.83" | 830 m || 
|-id=365 bgcolor=#fefefe
| 273365 ||  || — || October 23, 2006 || Catalina || CSS || — || align=right | 1.2 km || 
|-id=366 bgcolor=#E9E9E9
| 273366 ||  || — || October 16, 2006 || Catalina || CSS || — || align=right | 1.1 km || 
|-id=367 bgcolor=#fefefe
| 273367 ||  || — || October 19, 2006 || Mount Lemmon || Mount Lemmon Survey || FLO || align=right data-sort-value="0.78" | 780 m || 
|-id=368 bgcolor=#fefefe
| 273368 ||  || — || October 20, 2006 || Palomar || NEAT || NYS || align=right data-sort-value="0.72" | 720 m || 
|-id=369 bgcolor=#E9E9E9
| 273369 ||  || — || October 21, 2006 || Palomar || NEAT || — || align=right | 2.1 km || 
|-id=370 bgcolor=#fefefe
| 273370 ||  || — || October 21, 2006 || Palomar || NEAT || FLO || align=right data-sort-value="0.68" | 680 m || 
|-id=371 bgcolor=#fefefe
| 273371 ||  || — || October 23, 2006 || Kitt Peak || Spacewatch || — || align=right data-sort-value="0.61" | 610 m || 
|-id=372 bgcolor=#fefefe
| 273372 ||  || — || October 29, 2006 || Mount Lemmon || Mount Lemmon Survey || — || align=right | 1.0 km || 
|-id=373 bgcolor=#E9E9E9
| 273373 ||  || — || October 27, 2006 || Kitt Peak || Spacewatch || MAR || align=right | 1.1 km || 
|-id=374 bgcolor=#fefefe
| 273374 ||  || — || October 27, 2006 || Mount Lemmon || Mount Lemmon Survey || FLO || align=right data-sort-value="0.62" | 620 m || 
|-id=375 bgcolor=#fefefe
| 273375 ||  || — || October 28, 2006 || Kitt Peak || Spacewatch || — || align=right data-sort-value="0.75" | 750 m || 
|-id=376 bgcolor=#fefefe
| 273376 ||  || — || October 29, 2006 || La Sagra || OAM Obs. || — || align=right data-sort-value="0.67" | 670 m || 
|-id=377 bgcolor=#fefefe
| 273377 ||  || — || October 28, 2006 || Mount Lemmon || Mount Lemmon Survey || — || align=right data-sort-value="0.70" | 700 m || 
|-id=378 bgcolor=#fefefe
| 273378 ||  || — || November 2, 2006 || Antares || ARO || FLO || align=right data-sort-value="0.76" | 760 m || 
|-id=379 bgcolor=#fefefe
| 273379 ||  || — || November 11, 2006 || Catalina || CSS || MAS || align=right data-sort-value="0.66" | 660 m || 
|-id=380 bgcolor=#E9E9E9
| 273380 ||  || — || November 11, 2006 || Catalina || CSS || — || align=right | 2.2 km || 
|-id=381 bgcolor=#fefefe
| 273381 ||  || — || November 9, 2006 || Kitt Peak || Spacewatch || — || align=right data-sort-value="0.75" | 750 m || 
|-id=382 bgcolor=#fefefe
| 273382 ||  || — || November 10, 2006 || Kitt Peak || Spacewatch || — || align=right data-sort-value="0.85" | 850 m || 
|-id=383 bgcolor=#fefefe
| 273383 ||  || — || November 11, 2006 || Catalina || CSS || FLO || align=right data-sort-value="0.81" | 810 m || 
|-id=384 bgcolor=#E9E9E9
| 273384 ||  || — || November 12, 2006 || Mount Lemmon || Mount Lemmon Survey || — || align=right | 1.7 km || 
|-id=385 bgcolor=#fefefe
| 273385 ||  || — || November 12, 2006 || Mount Lemmon || Mount Lemmon Survey || — || align=right | 1.1 km || 
|-id=386 bgcolor=#fefefe
| 273386 ||  || — || November 13, 2006 || Catalina || CSS || V || align=right data-sort-value="0.93" | 930 m || 
|-id=387 bgcolor=#fefefe
| 273387 ||  || — || November 10, 2006 || Kitt Peak || Spacewatch || — || align=right data-sort-value="0.98" | 980 m || 
|-id=388 bgcolor=#fefefe
| 273388 ||  || — || November 10, 2006 || Kitt Peak || Spacewatch || NYS || align=right data-sort-value="0.84" | 840 m || 
|-id=389 bgcolor=#fefefe
| 273389 ||  || — || November 11, 2006 || Kitt Peak || Spacewatch || — || align=right data-sort-value="0.84" | 840 m || 
|-id=390 bgcolor=#fefefe
| 273390 ||  || — || November 11, 2006 || Kitt Peak || Spacewatch || FLO || align=right data-sort-value="0.56" | 560 m || 
|-id=391 bgcolor=#fefefe
| 273391 ||  || — || November 11, 2006 || Kitt Peak || Spacewatch || — || align=right data-sort-value="0.93" | 930 m || 
|-id=392 bgcolor=#fefefe
| 273392 ||  || — || November 11, 2006 || Kitt Peak || Spacewatch || NYS || align=right data-sort-value="0.72" | 720 m || 
|-id=393 bgcolor=#fefefe
| 273393 ||  || — || November 10, 2006 || Kitt Peak || Spacewatch || FLO || align=right data-sort-value="0.67" | 670 m || 
|-id=394 bgcolor=#fefefe
| 273394 ||  || — || November 11, 2006 || Kitt Peak || Spacewatch || — || align=right | 1.0 km || 
|-id=395 bgcolor=#fefefe
| 273395 ||  || — || November 1, 2006 || Catalina || CSS || NYS || align=right data-sort-value="0.69" | 690 m || 
|-id=396 bgcolor=#E9E9E9
| 273396 ||  || — || November 12, 2006 || Mount Lemmon || Mount Lemmon Survey || — || align=right | 1.3 km || 
|-id=397 bgcolor=#fefefe
| 273397 ||  || — || November 13, 2006 || Kitt Peak || Spacewatch || FLO || align=right data-sort-value="0.71" | 710 m || 
|-id=398 bgcolor=#E9E9E9
| 273398 ||  || — || November 13, 2006 || Kitt Peak || Spacewatch || — || align=right | 1.9 km || 
|-id=399 bgcolor=#fefefe
| 273399 ||  || — || November 15, 2006 || Socorro || LINEAR || ERI || align=right | 2.0 km || 
|-id=400 bgcolor=#fefefe
| 273400 ||  || — || November 15, 2006 || Mount Lemmon || Mount Lemmon Survey || — || align=right data-sort-value="0.94" | 940 m || 
|}

273401–273500 

|-bgcolor=#fefefe
| 273401 ||  || — || November 15, 2006 || Catalina || CSS || NYS || align=right data-sort-value="0.86" | 860 m || 
|-id=402 bgcolor=#fefefe
| 273402 ||  || — || November 15, 2006 || Kitt Peak || Spacewatch || — || align=right data-sort-value="0.74" | 740 m || 
|-id=403 bgcolor=#fefefe
| 273403 ||  || — || November 15, 2006 || Kitt Peak || Spacewatch || — || align=right data-sort-value="0.76" | 760 m || 
|-id=404 bgcolor=#fefefe
| 273404 ||  || — || November 15, 2006 || Kitt Peak || Spacewatch || — || align=right data-sort-value="0.94" | 940 m || 
|-id=405 bgcolor=#fefefe
| 273405 ||  || — || November 15, 2006 || Kitt Peak || Spacewatch || — || align=right data-sort-value="0.71" | 710 m || 
|-id=406 bgcolor=#fefefe
| 273406 ||  || — || November 15, 2006 || Catalina || CSS || — || align=right | 1.1 km || 
|-id=407 bgcolor=#fefefe
| 273407 ||  || — || November 15, 2006 || Kitt Peak || Spacewatch || — || align=right data-sort-value="0.89" | 890 m || 
|-id=408 bgcolor=#E9E9E9
| 273408 ||  || — || November 9, 2006 || Palomar || NEAT || RAF || align=right | 1.2 km || 
|-id=409 bgcolor=#fefefe
| 273409 ||  || — || November 8, 2006 || Palomar || NEAT || FLO || align=right data-sort-value="0.77" | 770 m || 
|-id=410 bgcolor=#fefefe
| 273410 ||  || — || November 1, 2006 || Mount Lemmon || Mount Lemmon Survey || — || align=right | 1.1 km || 
|-id=411 bgcolor=#fefefe
| 273411 ||  || — || November 2, 2006 || Kitt Peak || Spacewatch || — || align=right data-sort-value="0.95" | 950 m || 
|-id=412 bgcolor=#fefefe
| 273412 Eduardomissoni ||  ||  || November 18, 2006 || Vallemare di Borbona || V. S. Casulli || V || align=right data-sort-value="0.74" | 740 m || 
|-id=413 bgcolor=#E9E9E9
| 273413 ||  || — || November 19, 2006 || Socorro || LINEAR || — || align=right | 2.1 km || 
|-id=414 bgcolor=#fefefe
| 273414 ||  || — || November 16, 2006 || Socorro || LINEAR || — || align=right | 1.1 km || 
|-id=415 bgcolor=#fefefe
| 273415 ||  || — || November 16, 2006 || Socorro || LINEAR || FLO || align=right data-sort-value="0.67" | 670 m || 
|-id=416 bgcolor=#fefefe
| 273416 ||  || — || November 16, 2006 || Socorro || LINEAR || — || align=right | 1.2 km || 
|-id=417 bgcolor=#fefefe
| 273417 ||  || — || November 16, 2006 || Mount Lemmon || Mount Lemmon Survey || — || align=right | 1.4 km || 
|-id=418 bgcolor=#fefefe
| 273418 ||  || — || November 17, 2006 || Kitt Peak || Spacewatch || — || align=right data-sort-value="0.75" | 750 m || 
|-id=419 bgcolor=#FA8072
| 273419 ||  || — || November 17, 2006 || Mount Lemmon || Mount Lemmon Survey || — || align=right data-sort-value="0.78" | 780 m || 
|-id=420 bgcolor=#E9E9E9
| 273420 ||  || — || November 22, 2006 || 7300 Observatory || W. K. Y. Yeung || — || align=right | 2.9 km || 
|-id=421 bgcolor=#fefefe
| 273421 ||  || — || November 16, 2006 || Kitt Peak || Spacewatch || FLO || align=right data-sort-value="0.61" | 610 m || 
|-id=422 bgcolor=#E9E9E9
| 273422 ||  || — || November 16, 2006 || Kitt Peak || Spacewatch || — || align=right | 1.5 km || 
|-id=423 bgcolor=#E9E9E9
| 273423 ||  || — || November 16, 2006 || Mount Lemmon || Mount Lemmon Survey || — || align=right | 1.8 km || 
|-id=424 bgcolor=#E9E9E9
| 273424 ||  || — || November 16, 2006 || Kitt Peak || Spacewatch || — || align=right | 3.0 km || 
|-id=425 bgcolor=#fefefe
| 273425 ||  || — || November 17, 2006 || Kitt Peak || Spacewatch || NYS || align=right data-sort-value="0.73" | 730 m || 
|-id=426 bgcolor=#fefefe
| 273426 ||  || — || November 17, 2006 || Catalina || CSS || — || align=right data-sort-value="0.77" | 770 m || 
|-id=427 bgcolor=#fefefe
| 273427 ||  || — || November 17, 2006 || Mount Lemmon || Mount Lemmon Survey || — || align=right | 1.1 km || 
|-id=428 bgcolor=#fefefe
| 273428 ||  || — || November 18, 2006 || Kitt Peak || Spacewatch || FLO || align=right data-sort-value="0.75" | 750 m || 
|-id=429 bgcolor=#fefefe
| 273429 ||  || — || November 18, 2006 || Kitt Peak || Spacewatch || — || align=right data-sort-value="0.74" | 740 m || 
|-id=430 bgcolor=#fefefe
| 273430 ||  || — || November 19, 2006 || Kitt Peak || Spacewatch || MAS || align=right data-sort-value="0.65" | 650 m || 
|-id=431 bgcolor=#fefefe
| 273431 ||  || — || November 19, 2006 || Kitt Peak || Spacewatch || FLO || align=right data-sort-value="0.78" | 780 m || 
|-id=432 bgcolor=#fefefe
| 273432 ||  || — || November 21, 2006 || Mount Lemmon || Mount Lemmon Survey || FLO || align=right data-sort-value="0.76" | 760 m || 
|-id=433 bgcolor=#fefefe
| 273433 ||  || — || November 19, 2006 || Kitt Peak || Spacewatch || V || align=right data-sort-value="0.64" | 640 m || 
|-id=434 bgcolor=#fefefe
| 273434 ||  || — || November 19, 2006 || Kitt Peak || Spacewatch || — || align=right data-sort-value="0.65" | 650 m || 
|-id=435 bgcolor=#fefefe
| 273435 ||  || — || November 20, 2006 || Kitt Peak || Spacewatch || FLO || align=right data-sort-value="0.62" | 620 m || 
|-id=436 bgcolor=#fefefe
| 273436 ||  || — || November 20, 2006 || Kitt Peak || Spacewatch || — || align=right data-sort-value="0.90" | 900 m || 
|-id=437 bgcolor=#fefefe
| 273437 ||  || — || November 21, 2006 || Mount Lemmon || Mount Lemmon Survey || MAS || align=right data-sort-value="0.80" | 800 m || 
|-id=438 bgcolor=#fefefe
| 273438 ||  || — || November 21, 2006 || Mount Lemmon || Mount Lemmon Survey || V || align=right data-sort-value="0.76" | 760 m || 
|-id=439 bgcolor=#E9E9E9
| 273439 ||  || — || November 22, 2006 || Socorro || LINEAR || BRU || align=right | 5.7 km || 
|-id=440 bgcolor=#fefefe
| 273440 ||  || — || November 23, 2006 || Kitt Peak || Spacewatch || FLO || align=right data-sort-value="0.70" | 700 m || 
|-id=441 bgcolor=#fefefe
| 273441 ||  || — || November 23, 2006 || Kitt Peak || Spacewatch || NYS || align=right data-sort-value="0.76" | 760 m || 
|-id=442 bgcolor=#fefefe
| 273442 ||  || — || November 23, 2006 || Kitt Peak || Spacewatch || V || align=right data-sort-value="0.63" | 630 m || 
|-id=443 bgcolor=#fefefe
| 273443 ||  || — || November 24, 2006 || Kitt Peak || Spacewatch || — || align=right | 1.0 km || 
|-id=444 bgcolor=#fefefe
| 273444 ||  || — || November 25, 2006 || Mount Lemmon || Mount Lemmon Survey || V || align=right | 1.1 km || 
|-id=445 bgcolor=#fefefe
| 273445 ||  || — || November 15, 2006 || Catalina || CSS || V || align=right data-sort-value="0.99" | 990 m || 
|-id=446 bgcolor=#E9E9E9
| 273446 ||  || — || November 27, 2006 || Catalina || CSS || — || align=right | 1.1 km || 
|-id=447 bgcolor=#fefefe
| 273447 ||  || — || November 16, 2006 || Kitt Peak || Spacewatch || — || align=right | 1.1 km || 
|-id=448 bgcolor=#fefefe
| 273448 ||  || — || December 9, 2006 || Kitt Peak || Spacewatch || — || align=right | 1.0 km || 
|-id=449 bgcolor=#fefefe
| 273449 ||  || — || December 9, 2006 || Kitt Peak || Spacewatch || NYS || align=right data-sort-value="0.76" | 760 m || 
|-id=450 bgcolor=#fefefe
| 273450 ||  || — || December 10, 2006 || Kitt Peak || Spacewatch || — || align=right data-sort-value="0.96" | 960 m || 
|-id=451 bgcolor=#E9E9E9
| 273451 ||  || — || December 10, 2006 || Kitt Peak || Spacewatch || EUN || align=right | 1.5 km || 
|-id=452 bgcolor=#fefefe
| 273452 ||  || — || December 10, 2006 || Kitt Peak || Spacewatch || — || align=right | 1.1 km || 
|-id=453 bgcolor=#fefefe
| 273453 ||  || — || December 10, 2006 || Kitt Peak || Spacewatch || NYS || align=right data-sort-value="0.82" | 820 m || 
|-id=454 bgcolor=#fefefe
| 273454 ||  || — || December 12, 2006 || Mount Lemmon || Mount Lemmon Survey || — || align=right data-sort-value="0.95" | 950 m || 
|-id=455 bgcolor=#fefefe
| 273455 ||  || — || December 13, 2006 || Socorro || LINEAR || — || align=right | 1.0 km || 
|-id=456 bgcolor=#fefefe
| 273456 ||  || — || December 11, 2006 || Socorro || LINEAR || — || align=right | 1.4 km || 
|-id=457 bgcolor=#fefefe
| 273457 ||  || — || December 11, 2006 || Kitt Peak || Spacewatch || NYS || align=right data-sort-value="0.98" | 980 m || 
|-id=458 bgcolor=#fefefe
| 273458 ||  || — || December 12, 2006 || Socorro || LINEAR || — || align=right | 1.2 km || 
|-id=459 bgcolor=#fefefe
| 273459 ||  || — || December 12, 2006 || Mount Lemmon || Mount Lemmon Survey || FLO || align=right data-sort-value="0.73" | 730 m || 
|-id=460 bgcolor=#fefefe
| 273460 ||  || — || December 13, 2006 || Kitt Peak || Spacewatch || — || align=right data-sort-value="0.73" | 730 m || 
|-id=461 bgcolor=#fefefe
| 273461 ||  || — || September 6, 2002 || Campo Imperatore || CINEOS || — || align=right data-sort-value="0.94" | 940 m || 
|-id=462 bgcolor=#fefefe
| 273462 ||  || — || December 13, 2006 || Kitt Peak || Spacewatch || — || align=right data-sort-value="0.96" | 960 m || 
|-id=463 bgcolor=#E9E9E9
| 273463 ||  || — || December 13, 2006 || Catalina || CSS || — || align=right | 1.9 km || 
|-id=464 bgcolor=#fefefe
| 273464 ||  || — || December 13, 2006 || Kitt Peak || Spacewatch || MAS || align=right data-sort-value="0.80" | 800 m || 
|-id=465 bgcolor=#fefefe
| 273465 ||  || — || December 13, 2006 || Kitt Peak || Spacewatch || — || align=right data-sort-value="0.80" | 800 m || 
|-id=466 bgcolor=#fefefe
| 273466 ||  || — || December 14, 2006 || Socorro || LINEAR || — || align=right | 1.2 km || 
|-id=467 bgcolor=#fefefe
| 273467 ||  || — || December 15, 2006 || Mount Lemmon || Mount Lemmon Survey || NYS || align=right data-sort-value="0.81" | 810 m || 
|-id=468 bgcolor=#fefefe
| 273468 ||  || — || December 12, 2006 || Palomar || NEAT || — || align=right | 1.3 km || 
|-id=469 bgcolor=#fefefe
| 273469 ||  || — || December 13, 2006 || Mount Lemmon || Mount Lemmon Survey || — || align=right | 2.4 km || 
|-id=470 bgcolor=#fefefe
| 273470 ||  || — || December 13, 2006 || Mount Lemmon || Mount Lemmon Survey || NYS || align=right data-sort-value="0.76" | 760 m || 
|-id=471 bgcolor=#fefefe
| 273471 ||  || — || December 16, 2006 || Vallemare Borbon || V. S. Casulli || — || align=right data-sort-value="0.80" | 800 m || 
|-id=472 bgcolor=#fefefe
| 273472 ||  || — || December 20, 2006 || Mount Lemmon || Mount Lemmon Survey || FLO || align=right data-sort-value="0.81" | 810 m || 
|-id=473 bgcolor=#fefefe
| 273473 ||  || — || December 20, 2006 || Mount Lemmon || Mount Lemmon Survey || FLO || align=right data-sort-value="0.88" | 880 m || 
|-id=474 bgcolor=#fefefe
| 273474 ||  || — || December 21, 2006 || Kitt Peak || Spacewatch || FLO || align=right data-sort-value="0.80" | 800 m || 
|-id=475 bgcolor=#fefefe
| 273475 ||  || — || December 21, 2006 || Anderson Mesa || LONEOS || — || align=right | 1.0 km || 
|-id=476 bgcolor=#E9E9E9
| 273476 ||  || — || December 22, 2006 || Črni Vrh || Črni Vrh || — || align=right | 4.2 km || 
|-id=477 bgcolor=#fefefe
| 273477 ||  || — || December 18, 2006 || Socorro || LINEAR || FLO || align=right data-sort-value="0.83" | 830 m || 
|-id=478 bgcolor=#fefefe
| 273478 ||  || — || December 21, 2006 || Mount Lemmon || Mount Lemmon Survey || — || align=right data-sort-value="0.82" | 820 m || 
|-id=479 bgcolor=#fefefe
| 273479 ||  || — || December 21, 2006 || Palomar || NEAT || — || align=right | 1.4 km || 
|-id=480 bgcolor=#fefefe
| 273480 ||  || — || December 21, 2006 || Kitt Peak || Spacewatch || — || align=right data-sort-value="0.91" | 910 m || 
|-id=481 bgcolor=#fefefe
| 273481 ||  || — || December 21, 2006 || Kitt Peak || Spacewatch || FLO || align=right data-sort-value="0.87" | 870 m || 
|-id=482 bgcolor=#fefefe
| 273482 ||  || — || December 21, 2006 || Kitt Peak || Spacewatch || V || align=right | 1.0 km || 
|-id=483 bgcolor=#fefefe
| 273483 ||  || — || December 22, 2006 || Kitt Peak || Spacewatch || — || align=right | 1.2 km || 
|-id=484 bgcolor=#fefefe
| 273484 ||  || — || December 29, 2006 || Pla D'Arguines || R. Ferrando || — || align=right | 1.8 km || 
|-id=485 bgcolor=#fefefe
| 273485 ||  || — || December 23, 2006 || Mount Lemmon || Mount Lemmon Survey || NYS || align=right data-sort-value="0.78" | 780 m || 
|-id=486 bgcolor=#fefefe
| 273486 ||  || — || December 23, 2006 || Mount Lemmon || Mount Lemmon Survey || MAS || align=right data-sort-value="0.76" | 760 m || 
|-id=487 bgcolor=#fefefe
| 273487 ||  || — || December 24, 2006 || Mount Lemmon || Mount Lemmon Survey || NYS || align=right data-sort-value="0.79" | 790 m || 
|-id=488 bgcolor=#fefefe
| 273488 ||  || — || January 8, 2007 || Mount Lemmon || Mount Lemmon Survey || MAS || align=right data-sort-value="0.70" | 700 m || 
|-id=489 bgcolor=#fefefe
| 273489 ||  || — || January 8, 2007 || Catalina || CSS || CIM || align=right | 2.9 km || 
|-id=490 bgcolor=#fefefe
| 273490 ||  || — || January 8, 2007 || Catalina || CSS || — || align=right | 1.1 km || 
|-id=491 bgcolor=#fefefe
| 273491 ||  || — || January 8, 2007 || Kitt Peak || Spacewatch || — || align=right data-sort-value="0.90" | 900 m || 
|-id=492 bgcolor=#fefefe
| 273492 ||  || — || January 9, 2007 || Mount Lemmon || Mount Lemmon Survey || — || align=right data-sort-value="0.98" | 980 m || 
|-id=493 bgcolor=#fefefe
| 273493 ||  || — || January 9, 2007 || Mount Lemmon || Mount Lemmon Survey || NYS || align=right data-sort-value="0.86" | 860 m || 
|-id=494 bgcolor=#fefefe
| 273494 ||  || — || January 10, 2007 || Mount Lemmon || Mount Lemmon Survey || NYS || align=right data-sort-value="0.69" | 690 m || 
|-id=495 bgcolor=#fefefe
| 273495 ||  || — || January 10, 2007 || Mount Lemmon || Mount Lemmon Survey || — || align=right | 1.2 km || 
|-id=496 bgcolor=#fefefe
| 273496 ||  || — || January 10, 2007 || Kitt Peak || Spacewatch || — || align=right | 1.00 km || 
|-id=497 bgcolor=#fefefe
| 273497 ||  || — || January 8, 2007 || Catalina || CSS || FLO || align=right | 1.0 km || 
|-id=498 bgcolor=#fefefe
| 273498 ||  || — || January 13, 2007 || Socorro || LINEAR || V || align=right | 1.2 km || 
|-id=499 bgcolor=#fefefe
| 273499 ||  || — || January 10, 2007 || Mount Lemmon || Mount Lemmon Survey || NYS || align=right data-sort-value="0.83" | 830 m || 
|-id=500 bgcolor=#E9E9E9
| 273500 ||  || — || January 10, 2007 || Mount Lemmon || Mount Lemmon Survey || — || align=right | 2.4 km || 
|}

273501–273600 

|-bgcolor=#fefefe
| 273501 ||  || — || January 12, 2007 || 7300 || W. K. Y. Yeung || — || align=right | 1.1 km || 
|-id=502 bgcolor=#fefefe
| 273502 ||  || — || January 9, 2007 || Mount Lemmon || Mount Lemmon Survey || — || align=right | 1.0 km || 
|-id=503 bgcolor=#fefefe
| 273503 ||  || — || January 9, 2007 || Kitt Peak || Spacewatch || NYS || align=right data-sort-value="0.89" | 890 m || 
|-id=504 bgcolor=#fefefe
| 273504 ||  || — || January 10, 2007 || Kitt Peak || Spacewatch || NYS || align=right data-sort-value="0.59" | 590 m || 
|-id=505 bgcolor=#fefefe
| 273505 ||  || — || January 10, 2007 || Mount Lemmon || Mount Lemmon Survey || — || align=right data-sort-value="0.71" | 710 m || 
|-id=506 bgcolor=#fefefe
| 273506 ||  || — || January 9, 2007 || Kitt Peak || Spacewatch || MAS || align=right data-sort-value="0.68" | 680 m || 
|-id=507 bgcolor=#fefefe
| 273507 ||  || — || January 9, 2007 || Kitt Peak || Spacewatch || MAS || align=right data-sort-value="0.82" | 820 m || 
|-id=508 bgcolor=#fefefe
| 273508 ||  || — || January 10, 2007 || Mount Lemmon || Mount Lemmon Survey || NYS || align=right data-sort-value="0.79" | 790 m || 
|-id=509 bgcolor=#fefefe
| 273509 ||  || — || January 16, 2007 || Mount Lemmon || Mount Lemmon Survey || — || align=right data-sort-value="0.98" | 980 m || 
|-id=510 bgcolor=#E9E9E9
| 273510 ||  || — || October 23, 2006 || Mount Lemmon || Mount Lemmon Survey || — || align=right | 1.8 km || 
|-id=511 bgcolor=#fefefe
| 273511 ||  || — || January 16, 2007 || Socorro || LINEAR || — || align=right | 1.0 km || 
|-id=512 bgcolor=#fefefe
| 273512 ||  || — || January 16, 2007 || Socorro || LINEAR || — || align=right data-sort-value="0.87" | 870 m || 
|-id=513 bgcolor=#fefefe
| 273513 ||  || — || January 16, 2007 || Socorro || LINEAR || NYS || align=right data-sort-value="0.81" | 810 m || 
|-id=514 bgcolor=#E9E9E9
| 273514 ||  || — || January 17, 2007 || Catalina || CSS || — || align=right | 1.5 km || 
|-id=515 bgcolor=#fefefe
| 273515 ||  || — || January 17, 2007 || Kitt Peak || Spacewatch || — || align=right | 1.2 km || 
|-id=516 bgcolor=#fefefe
| 273516 ||  || — || January 17, 2007 || Kitt Peak || Spacewatch || V || align=right data-sort-value="0.80" | 800 m || 
|-id=517 bgcolor=#fefefe
| 273517 ||  || — || January 17, 2007 || Kitt Peak || Spacewatch || NYS || align=right data-sort-value="0.75" | 750 m || 
|-id=518 bgcolor=#fefefe
| 273518 ||  || — || January 17, 2007 || Kitt Peak || Spacewatch || — || align=right data-sort-value="0.98" | 980 m || 
|-id=519 bgcolor=#fefefe
| 273519 ||  || — || January 17, 2007 || Kitt Peak || Spacewatch || MAS || align=right | 1.0 km || 
|-id=520 bgcolor=#fefefe
| 273520 ||  || — || January 17, 2007 || Kitt Peak || Spacewatch || MAS || align=right data-sort-value="0.96" | 960 m || 
|-id=521 bgcolor=#fefefe
| 273521 ||  || — || January 17, 2007 || Palomar || NEAT || V || align=right data-sort-value="0.90" | 900 m || 
|-id=522 bgcolor=#fefefe
| 273522 ||  || — || January 17, 2007 || Kitt Peak || Spacewatch || — || align=right | 1.4 km || 
|-id=523 bgcolor=#fefefe
| 273523 ||  || — || January 17, 2007 || Palomar || NEAT || — || align=right data-sort-value="0.89" | 890 m || 
|-id=524 bgcolor=#fefefe
| 273524 ||  || — || January 21, 2007 || Socorro || LINEAR || — || align=right | 1.5 km || 
|-id=525 bgcolor=#fefefe
| 273525 ||  || — || January 24, 2007 || Socorro || LINEAR || NYS || align=right data-sort-value="0.66" | 660 m || 
|-id=526 bgcolor=#fefefe
| 273526 ||  || — || January 24, 2007 || Mount Lemmon || Mount Lemmon Survey || FLO || align=right data-sort-value="0.79" | 790 m || 
|-id=527 bgcolor=#fefefe
| 273527 ||  || — || January 24, 2007 || Mount Lemmon || Mount Lemmon Survey || — || align=right data-sort-value="0.92" | 920 m || 
|-id=528 bgcolor=#fefefe
| 273528 ||  || — || January 24, 2007 || Catalina || CSS || FLO || align=right data-sort-value="0.77" | 770 m || 
|-id=529 bgcolor=#fefefe
| 273529 ||  || — || January 24, 2007 || Catalina || CSS || — || align=right data-sort-value="0.96" | 960 m || 
|-id=530 bgcolor=#fefefe
| 273530 ||  || — || January 24, 2007 || Catalina || CSS || MAS || align=right data-sort-value="0.95" | 950 m || 
|-id=531 bgcolor=#fefefe
| 273531 ||  || — || January 24, 2007 || Catalina || CSS || NYS || align=right data-sort-value="0.91" | 910 m || 
|-id=532 bgcolor=#fefefe
| 273532 ||  || — || January 24, 2007 || Mount Lemmon || Mount Lemmon Survey || NYS || align=right data-sort-value="0.88" | 880 m || 
|-id=533 bgcolor=#fefefe
| 273533 ||  || — || January 24, 2007 || Mount Lemmon || Mount Lemmon Survey || NYS || align=right data-sort-value="0.70" | 700 m || 
|-id=534 bgcolor=#fefefe
| 273534 ||  || — || January 24, 2007 || Mount Lemmon || Mount Lemmon Survey || — || align=right data-sort-value="0.74" | 740 m || 
|-id=535 bgcolor=#fefefe
| 273535 ||  || — || January 24, 2007 || Socorro || LINEAR || — || align=right data-sort-value="0.87" | 870 m || 
|-id=536 bgcolor=#fefefe
| 273536 ||  || — || January 24, 2007 || Mount Lemmon || Mount Lemmon Survey || — || align=right data-sort-value="0.77" | 770 m || 
|-id=537 bgcolor=#fefefe
| 273537 ||  || — || January 24, 2007 || Mount Lemmon || Mount Lemmon Survey || FLO || align=right data-sort-value="0.85" | 850 m || 
|-id=538 bgcolor=#fefefe
| 273538 ||  || — || January 24, 2007 || Catalina || CSS || — || align=right | 1.0 km || 
|-id=539 bgcolor=#fefefe
| 273539 ||  || — || January 24, 2007 || Catalina || CSS || NYS || align=right data-sort-value="0.86" | 860 m || 
|-id=540 bgcolor=#fefefe
| 273540 ||  || — || January 24, 2007 || Catalina || CSS || — || align=right | 1.1 km || 
|-id=541 bgcolor=#fefefe
| 273541 ||  || — || January 24, 2007 || Catalina || CSS || MAS || align=right | 1.1 km || 
|-id=542 bgcolor=#fefefe
| 273542 ||  || — || January 26, 2007 || Kitt Peak || Spacewatch || NYS || align=right data-sort-value="0.79" | 790 m || 
|-id=543 bgcolor=#fefefe
| 273543 ||  || — || January 26, 2007 || Kitt Peak || Spacewatch || NYS || align=right data-sort-value="0.77" | 770 m || 
|-id=544 bgcolor=#E9E9E9
| 273544 ||  || — || January 28, 2007 || Marly || P. Kocher || — || align=right | 2.2 km || 
|-id=545 bgcolor=#E9E9E9
| 273545 ||  || — || January 24, 2007 || Kitt Peak || Spacewatch || — || align=right | 1.1 km || 
|-id=546 bgcolor=#fefefe
| 273546 ||  || — || January 24, 2007 || Socorro || LINEAR || — || align=right data-sort-value="0.95" | 950 m || 
|-id=547 bgcolor=#fefefe
| 273547 ||  || — || January 24, 2007 || Socorro || LINEAR || — || align=right | 1.0 km || 
|-id=548 bgcolor=#fefefe
| 273548 ||  || — || January 24, 2007 || Socorro || LINEAR || — || align=right | 1.2 km || 
|-id=549 bgcolor=#fefefe
| 273549 ||  || — || January 24, 2007 || Socorro || LINEAR || — || align=right | 1.0 km || 
|-id=550 bgcolor=#fefefe
| 273550 ||  || — || January 24, 2007 || Socorro || LINEAR || NYS || align=right data-sort-value="0.83" | 830 m || 
|-id=551 bgcolor=#fefefe
| 273551 ||  || — || January 27, 2007 || Kitt Peak || Spacewatch || MAS || align=right data-sort-value="0.84" | 840 m || 
|-id=552 bgcolor=#fefefe
| 273552 ||  || — || January 27, 2007 || Mount Lemmon || Mount Lemmon Survey || MAS || align=right data-sort-value="0.73" | 730 m || 
|-id=553 bgcolor=#fefefe
| 273553 ||  || — || January 27, 2007 || Kitt Peak || Spacewatch || — || align=right data-sort-value="0.88" | 880 m || 
|-id=554 bgcolor=#fefefe
| 273554 ||  || — || January 27, 2007 || Mount Lemmon || Mount Lemmon Survey || — || align=right data-sort-value="0.99" | 990 m || 
|-id=555 bgcolor=#fefefe
| 273555 ||  || — || January 27, 2007 || Mount Lemmon || Mount Lemmon Survey || MAS || align=right data-sort-value="0.78" | 780 m || 
|-id=556 bgcolor=#fefefe
| 273556 ||  || — || January 27, 2007 || Kitt Peak || Spacewatch || NYS || align=right | 1.9 km || 
|-id=557 bgcolor=#E9E9E9
| 273557 ||  || — || January 27, 2007 || Mount Lemmon || Mount Lemmon Survey || — || align=right | 2.2 km || 
|-id=558 bgcolor=#fefefe
| 273558 ||  || — || January 27, 2007 || Kitt Peak || Spacewatch || NYS || align=right data-sort-value="0.69" | 690 m || 
|-id=559 bgcolor=#fefefe
| 273559 ||  || — || January 17, 2007 || Kitt Peak || Spacewatch || V || align=right data-sort-value="0.88" | 880 m || 
|-id=560 bgcolor=#fefefe
| 273560 ||  || — || January 27, 2007 || Mount Lemmon || Mount Lemmon Survey || FLO || align=right data-sort-value="0.75" | 750 m || 
|-id=561 bgcolor=#fefefe
| 273561 ||  || — || January 27, 2007 || Mount Lemmon || Mount Lemmon Survey || V || align=right data-sort-value="0.87" | 870 m || 
|-id=562 bgcolor=#fefefe
| 273562 ||  || — || January 27, 2007 || Kitt Peak || Spacewatch || NYS || align=right data-sort-value="0.72" | 720 m || 
|-id=563 bgcolor=#fefefe
| 273563 ||  || — || January 28, 2007 || Kitt Peak || Spacewatch || NYS || align=right data-sort-value="0.82" | 820 m || 
|-id=564 bgcolor=#fefefe
| 273564 ||  || — || January 19, 2007 || Mauna Kea || Mauna Kea Obs. || NYS || align=right data-sort-value="0.66" | 660 m || 
|-id=565 bgcolor=#fefefe
| 273565 ||  || — || January 19, 2007 || Mauna Kea || Mauna Kea Obs. || NYS || align=right data-sort-value="0.64" | 640 m || 
|-id=566 bgcolor=#E9E9E9
| 273566 ||  || — || January 17, 2007 || Kitt Peak || Spacewatch || — || align=right | 1.1 km || 
|-id=567 bgcolor=#fefefe
| 273567 ||  || — || January 28, 2007 || Mount Lemmon || Mount Lemmon Survey || MAS || align=right data-sort-value="0.98" | 980 m || 
|-id=568 bgcolor=#fefefe
| 273568 ||  || — || January 16, 2007 || Catalina || CSS || V || align=right data-sort-value="0.95" | 950 m || 
|-id=569 bgcolor=#fefefe
| 273569 ||  || — || February 5, 2007 || Palomar || NEAT || V || align=right data-sort-value="0.79" | 790 m || 
|-id=570 bgcolor=#fefefe
| 273570 ||  || — || February 6, 2007 || Kitt Peak || Spacewatch || — || align=right data-sort-value="0.89" | 890 m || 
|-id=571 bgcolor=#fefefe
| 273571 ||  || — || February 6, 2007 || Mount Lemmon || Mount Lemmon Survey || — || align=right | 1.2 km || 
|-id=572 bgcolor=#fefefe
| 273572 ||  || — || February 6, 2007 || Mount Lemmon || Mount Lemmon Survey || MAS || align=right data-sort-value="0.74" | 740 m || 
|-id=573 bgcolor=#fefefe
| 273573 ||  || — || February 6, 2007 || Kitt Peak || Spacewatch || — || align=right | 1.1 km || 
|-id=574 bgcolor=#fefefe
| 273574 ||  || — || February 6, 2007 || Mount Lemmon || Mount Lemmon Survey || NYS || align=right data-sort-value="0.74" | 740 m || 
|-id=575 bgcolor=#fefefe
| 273575 ||  || — || February 7, 2007 || Mount Lemmon || Mount Lemmon Survey || — || align=right data-sort-value="0.98" | 980 m || 
|-id=576 bgcolor=#fefefe
| 273576 ||  || — || February 6, 2007 || Palomar || NEAT || ERI || align=right | 2.1 km || 
|-id=577 bgcolor=#fefefe
| 273577 ||  || — || February 8, 2007 || Mount Lemmon || Mount Lemmon Survey || NYS || align=right data-sort-value="0.81" | 810 m || 
|-id=578 bgcolor=#fefefe
| 273578 ||  || — || February 6, 2007 || Mount Lemmon || Mount Lemmon Survey || MAS || align=right data-sort-value="0.88" | 880 m || 
|-id=579 bgcolor=#fefefe
| 273579 ||  || — || February 6, 2007 || Palomar || NEAT || — || align=right data-sort-value="0.98" | 980 m || 
|-id=580 bgcolor=#fefefe
| 273580 ||  || — || February 6, 2007 || Mount Lemmon || Mount Lemmon Survey || NYS || align=right data-sort-value="0.82" | 820 m || 
|-id=581 bgcolor=#fefefe
| 273581 ||  || — || February 6, 2007 || Mount Lemmon || Mount Lemmon Survey || — || align=right data-sort-value="0.96" | 960 m || 
|-id=582 bgcolor=#fefefe
| 273582 ||  || — || February 6, 2007 || Palomar || NEAT || — || align=right | 1.4 km || 
|-id=583 bgcolor=#fefefe
| 273583 ||  || — || February 9, 2007 || Catalina || CSS || — || align=right | 1.1 km || 
|-id=584 bgcolor=#E9E9E9
| 273584 ||  || — || February 6, 2007 || Mount Lemmon || Mount Lemmon Survey || — || align=right | 2.1 km || 
|-id=585 bgcolor=#fefefe
| 273585 ||  || — || February 8, 2007 || Palomar || NEAT || NYS || align=right data-sort-value="0.85" | 850 m || 
|-id=586 bgcolor=#fefefe
| 273586 ||  || — || February 8, 2007 || Palomar || NEAT || NYS || align=right data-sort-value="0.64" | 640 m || 
|-id=587 bgcolor=#fefefe
| 273587 ||  || — || February 8, 2007 || Palomar || NEAT || — || align=right | 1.6 km || 
|-id=588 bgcolor=#fefefe
| 273588 ||  || — || February 8, 2007 || Mount Lemmon || Mount Lemmon Survey || — || align=right | 1.4 km || 
|-id=589 bgcolor=#fefefe
| 273589 ||  || — || February 8, 2007 || Palomar || NEAT || V || align=right data-sort-value="0.92" | 920 m || 
|-id=590 bgcolor=#fefefe
| 273590 ||  || — || February 10, 2007 || Mount Lemmon || Mount Lemmon Survey || NYS || align=right data-sort-value="0.68" | 680 m || 
|-id=591 bgcolor=#fefefe
| 273591 ||  || — || February 13, 2007 || Catalina || CSS || — || align=right data-sort-value="0.99" | 990 m || 
|-id=592 bgcolor=#fefefe
| 273592 ||  || — || February 10, 2007 || Catalina || CSS || — || align=right | 1.1 km || 
|-id=593 bgcolor=#fefefe
| 273593 ||  || — || February 6, 2007 || Kitt Peak || Spacewatch || NYS || align=right data-sort-value="0.79" | 790 m || 
|-id=594 bgcolor=#fefefe
| 273594 ||  || — || February 9, 2007 || Catalina || CSS || V || align=right data-sort-value="0.89" | 890 m || 
|-id=595 bgcolor=#E9E9E9
| 273595 ||  || — || February 10, 2007 || Catalina || CSS || HNS || align=right | 1.6 km || 
|-id=596 bgcolor=#fefefe
| 273596 ||  || — || February 10, 2007 || Catalina || CSS || — || align=right | 2.4 km || 
|-id=597 bgcolor=#fefefe
| 273597 ||  || — || February 10, 2007 || Catalina || CSS || V || align=right data-sort-value="0.85" | 850 m || 
|-id=598 bgcolor=#fefefe
| 273598 ||  || — || February 10, 2007 || Catalina || CSS || — || align=right | 1.2 km || 
|-id=599 bgcolor=#fefefe
| 273599 ||  || — || February 10, 2007 || Catalina || CSS || — || align=right | 1.0 km || 
|-id=600 bgcolor=#fefefe
| 273600 ||  || — || February 10, 2007 || Catalina || CSS || V || align=right data-sort-value="0.87" | 870 m || 
|}

273601–273700 

|-bgcolor=#fefefe
| 273601 ||  || — || February 15, 2007 || Palomar || NEAT || — || align=right | 1.1 km || 
|-id=602 bgcolor=#fefefe
| 273602 ||  || — || February 13, 2007 || Socorro || LINEAR || NYS || align=right data-sort-value="0.80" | 800 m || 
|-id=603 bgcolor=#fefefe
| 273603 ||  || — || February 15, 2007 || Catalina || CSS || — || align=right | 1.1 km || 
|-id=604 bgcolor=#fefefe
| 273604 ||  || — || February 15, 2007 || Palomar || NEAT || NYS || align=right data-sort-value="0.70" | 700 m || 
|-id=605 bgcolor=#fefefe
| 273605 ||  || — || February 15, 2007 || Palomar || NEAT || MAS || align=right | 1.0 km || 
|-id=606 bgcolor=#fefefe
| 273606 ||  || — || February 6, 2007 || Palomar || NEAT || — || align=right | 1.2 km || 
|-id=607 bgcolor=#fefefe
| 273607 ||  || — || February 9, 2007 || Kitt Peak || Spacewatch || NYS || align=right data-sort-value="0.69" | 690 m || 
|-id=608 bgcolor=#fefefe
| 273608 ||  || — || February 16, 2007 || Mayhill || A. Lowe || — || align=right | 2.7 km || 
|-id=609 bgcolor=#fefefe
| 273609 ||  || — || February 16, 2007 || Catalina || CSS || V || align=right data-sort-value="0.88" | 880 m || 
|-id=610 bgcolor=#fefefe
| 273610 ||  || — || February 16, 2007 || Catalina || CSS || NYS || align=right data-sort-value="0.68" | 680 m || 
|-id=611 bgcolor=#fefefe
| 273611 ||  || — || February 16, 2007 || Mount Lemmon || Mount Lemmon Survey || V || align=right | 1.3 km || 
|-id=612 bgcolor=#fefefe
| 273612 ||  || — || February 17, 2007 || Kitt Peak || Spacewatch || — || align=right | 1.1 km || 
|-id=613 bgcolor=#fefefe
| 273613 ||  || — || February 16, 2007 || Catalina || CSS || — || align=right | 1.6 km || 
|-id=614 bgcolor=#fefefe
| 273614 ||  || — || February 16, 2007 || Palomar || NEAT || — || align=right | 1.2 km || 
|-id=615 bgcolor=#fefefe
| 273615 ||  || — || February 16, 2007 || Palomar || NEAT || — || align=right | 1.1 km || 
|-id=616 bgcolor=#E9E9E9
| 273616 ||  || — || February 17, 2007 || Kitt Peak || Spacewatch || — || align=right | 1.5 km || 
|-id=617 bgcolor=#fefefe
| 273617 ||  || — || February 17, 2007 || Kitt Peak || Spacewatch || MAS || align=right data-sort-value="0.96" | 960 m || 
|-id=618 bgcolor=#fefefe
| 273618 ||  || — || February 17, 2007 || Kitt Peak || Spacewatch || MAS || align=right data-sort-value="0.85" | 850 m || 
|-id=619 bgcolor=#fefefe
| 273619 ||  || — || February 17, 2007 || Kitt Peak || Spacewatch || NYS || align=right data-sort-value="0.84" | 840 m || 
|-id=620 bgcolor=#d6d6d6
| 273620 ||  || — || February 17, 2007 || Kitt Peak || Spacewatch || — || align=right | 2.3 km || 
|-id=621 bgcolor=#E9E9E9
| 273621 ||  || — || February 17, 2007 || Kitt Peak || Spacewatch || — || align=right data-sort-value="0.93" | 930 m || 
|-id=622 bgcolor=#fefefe
| 273622 ||  || — || February 17, 2007 || Kitt Peak || Spacewatch || V || align=right data-sort-value="0.86" | 860 m || 
|-id=623 bgcolor=#fefefe
| 273623 ||  || — || February 17, 2007 || Kitt Peak || Spacewatch || NYS || align=right data-sort-value="0.85" | 850 m || 
|-id=624 bgcolor=#E9E9E9
| 273624 ||  || — || February 17, 2007 || Kitt Peak || Spacewatch || — || align=right | 1.9 km || 
|-id=625 bgcolor=#E9E9E9
| 273625 ||  || — || February 17, 2007 || Kitt Peak || Spacewatch || WIT || align=right | 1.1 km || 
|-id=626 bgcolor=#E9E9E9
| 273626 ||  || — || February 17, 2007 || Kitt Peak || Spacewatch || — || align=right | 1.1 km || 
|-id=627 bgcolor=#E9E9E9
| 273627 ||  || — || February 17, 2007 || Kitt Peak || Spacewatch || MAR || align=right | 1.1 km || 
|-id=628 bgcolor=#fefefe
| 273628 ||  || — || February 17, 2007 || Kitt Peak || Spacewatch || MAS || align=right data-sort-value="0.78" | 780 m || 
|-id=629 bgcolor=#fefefe
| 273629 ||  || — || February 17, 2007 || Kitt Peak || Spacewatch || NYS || align=right data-sort-value="0.80" | 800 m || 
|-id=630 bgcolor=#fefefe
| 273630 ||  || — || February 19, 2007 || Mount Lemmon || Mount Lemmon Survey || — || align=right | 1.5 km || 
|-id=631 bgcolor=#fefefe
| 273631 ||  || — || February 16, 2007 || Mount Lemmon || Mount Lemmon Survey || — || align=right | 1.4 km || 
|-id=632 bgcolor=#fefefe
| 273632 ||  || — || February 21, 2007 || Kitt Peak || Spacewatch || — || align=right data-sort-value="0.91" | 910 m || 
|-id=633 bgcolor=#fefefe
| 273633 ||  || — || February 21, 2007 || Bergisch Gladbach || W. Bickel || — || align=right data-sort-value="0.83" | 830 m || 
|-id=634 bgcolor=#E9E9E9
| 273634 ||  || — || February 21, 2007 || Mount Lemmon || Mount Lemmon Survey || — || align=right | 1.5 km || 
|-id=635 bgcolor=#E9E9E9
| 273635 ||  || — || February 16, 2007 || Catalina || CSS || — || align=right | 1.0 km || 
|-id=636 bgcolor=#fefefe
| 273636 ||  || — || February 16, 2007 || Catalina || CSS || V || align=right | 1.0 km || 
|-id=637 bgcolor=#E9E9E9
| 273637 ||  || — || February 17, 2007 || Palomar || NEAT || EUN || align=right | 1.5 km || 
|-id=638 bgcolor=#fefefe
| 273638 ||  || — || February 19, 2007 || Mount Lemmon || Mount Lemmon Survey || — || align=right | 1.1 km || 
|-id=639 bgcolor=#fefefe
| 273639 ||  || — || February 19, 2007 || Mount Lemmon || Mount Lemmon Survey || — || align=right | 1.0 km || 
|-id=640 bgcolor=#E9E9E9
| 273640 ||  || — || February 21, 2007 || Kitt Peak || Spacewatch || — || align=right | 1.6 km || 
|-id=641 bgcolor=#fefefe
| 273641 ||  || — || February 21, 2007 || Socorro || LINEAR || — || align=right | 1.2 km || 
|-id=642 bgcolor=#fefefe
| 273642 ||  || — || February 21, 2007 || Mount Lemmon || Mount Lemmon Survey || — || align=right data-sort-value="0.84" | 840 m || 
|-id=643 bgcolor=#fefefe
| 273643 ||  || — || February 22, 2007 || Anderson Mesa || LONEOS || MAS || align=right | 1.1 km || 
|-id=644 bgcolor=#fefefe
| 273644 ||  || — || February 19, 2007 || Mount Lemmon || Mount Lemmon Survey || — || align=right | 1.2 km || 
|-id=645 bgcolor=#fefefe
| 273645 ||  || — || February 21, 2007 || Kitt Peak || Spacewatch || — || align=right | 1.1 km || 
|-id=646 bgcolor=#fefefe
| 273646 ||  || — || February 21, 2007 || Kitt Peak || Spacewatch || — || align=right | 1.0 km || 
|-id=647 bgcolor=#E9E9E9
| 273647 ||  || — || February 21, 2007 || Kitt Peak || Spacewatch || — || align=right | 1.3 km || 
|-id=648 bgcolor=#fefefe
| 273648 ||  || — || February 21, 2007 || Mount Lemmon || Mount Lemmon Survey || NYS || align=right data-sort-value="0.72" | 720 m || 
|-id=649 bgcolor=#fefefe
| 273649 ||  || — || February 21, 2007 || Kitt Peak || Spacewatch || MAS || align=right data-sort-value="0.87" | 870 m || 
|-id=650 bgcolor=#E9E9E9
| 273650 ||  || — || February 21, 2007 || Kitt Peak || Spacewatch || — || align=right | 1.1 km || 
|-id=651 bgcolor=#fefefe
| 273651 ||  || — || February 22, 2007 || Catalina || CSS || — || align=right | 2.1 km || 
|-id=652 bgcolor=#fefefe
| 273652 ||  || — || February 22, 2007 || Catalina || CSS || V || align=right data-sort-value="0.91" | 910 m || 
|-id=653 bgcolor=#fefefe
| 273653 ||  || — || February 23, 2007 || Kitt Peak || Spacewatch || NYS || align=right data-sort-value="0.97" | 970 m || 
|-id=654 bgcolor=#fefefe
| 273654 ||  || — || February 23, 2007 || Kitt Peak || Spacewatch || — || align=right | 1.0 km || 
|-id=655 bgcolor=#fefefe
| 273655 ||  || — || February 23, 2007 || Mount Lemmon || Mount Lemmon Survey || — || align=right | 1.1 km || 
|-id=656 bgcolor=#E9E9E9
| 273656 ||  || — || February 25, 2007 || Mount Lemmon || Mount Lemmon Survey || — || align=right | 3.3 km || 
|-id=657 bgcolor=#fefefe
| 273657 ||  || — || February 23, 2007 || Mount Lemmon || Mount Lemmon Survey || — || align=right | 1.3 km || 
|-id=658 bgcolor=#E9E9E9
| 273658 ||  || — || February 23, 2007 || Mount Lemmon || Mount Lemmon Survey || — || align=right | 1.1 km || 
|-id=659 bgcolor=#fefefe
| 273659 ||  || — || February 23, 2007 || Kitt Peak || Spacewatch || NYS || align=right data-sort-value="0.90" | 900 m || 
|-id=660 bgcolor=#fefefe
| 273660 ||  || — || February 23, 2007 || Kitt Peak || Spacewatch || — || align=right data-sort-value="0.79" | 790 m || 
|-id=661 bgcolor=#E9E9E9
| 273661 ||  || — || February 23, 2007 || Kitt Peak || Spacewatch || — || align=right | 1.8 km || 
|-id=662 bgcolor=#fefefe
| 273662 ||  || — || February 23, 2007 || Mount Lemmon || Mount Lemmon Survey || — || align=right data-sort-value="0.91" | 910 m || 
|-id=663 bgcolor=#E9E9E9
| 273663 ||  || — || February 25, 2007 || Mount Lemmon || Mount Lemmon Survey || — || align=right | 1.7 km || 
|-id=664 bgcolor=#fefefe
| 273664 ||  || — || February 25, 2007 || Mount Lemmon || Mount Lemmon Survey || — || align=right | 2.0 km || 
|-id=665 bgcolor=#fefefe
| 273665 ||  || — || February 25, 2007 || Mount Lemmon || Mount Lemmon Survey || MAS || align=right data-sort-value="0.96" | 960 m || 
|-id=666 bgcolor=#fefefe
| 273666 ||  || — || February 21, 2007 || Kitt Peak || M. W. Buie || ERI || align=right | 1.9 km || 
|-id=667 bgcolor=#E9E9E9
| 273667 ||  || — || February 23, 2007 || Mount Lemmon || Mount Lemmon Survey || — || align=right | 1.4 km || 
|-id=668 bgcolor=#E9E9E9
| 273668 ||  || — || February 25, 2007 || Mount Lemmon || Mount Lemmon Survey || — || align=right | 1.0 km || 
|-id=669 bgcolor=#E9E9E9
| 273669 ||  || — || February 17, 2007 || Mount Lemmon || Mount Lemmon Survey || — || align=right | 1.1 km || 
|-id=670 bgcolor=#E9E9E9
| 273670 ||  || — || February 26, 2007 || Mount Lemmon || Mount Lemmon Survey || — || align=right | 1.9 km || 
|-id=671 bgcolor=#fefefe
| 273671 ||  || — || February 17, 2007 || Kitt Peak || Spacewatch || FLO || align=right data-sort-value="0.77" | 770 m || 
|-id=672 bgcolor=#E9E9E9
| 273672 ||  || — || February 23, 2007 || Mount Lemmon || Mount Lemmon Survey || — || align=right data-sort-value="0.93" | 930 m || 
|-id=673 bgcolor=#fefefe
| 273673 ||  || — || March 9, 2007 || Catalina || CSS || V || align=right data-sort-value="0.83" | 830 m || 
|-id=674 bgcolor=#fefefe
| 273674 ||  || — || March 9, 2007 || Catalina || CSS || — || align=right | 2.5 km || 
|-id=675 bgcolor=#fefefe
| 273675 ||  || — || March 9, 2007 || Mount Lemmon || Mount Lemmon Survey || — || align=right data-sort-value="0.88" | 880 m || 
|-id=676 bgcolor=#fefefe
| 273676 ||  || — || March 9, 2007 || Mount Lemmon || Mount Lemmon Survey || — || align=right | 1.1 km || 
|-id=677 bgcolor=#fefefe
| 273677 ||  || — || March 9, 2007 || Kitt Peak || Spacewatch || MAS || align=right | 1.1 km || 
|-id=678 bgcolor=#fefefe
| 273678 ||  || — || March 9, 2007 || Catalina || CSS || NYS || align=right data-sort-value="0.79" | 790 m || 
|-id=679 bgcolor=#E9E9E9
| 273679 ||  || — || March 9, 2007 || Kitt Peak || Spacewatch || — || align=right | 1.4 km || 
|-id=680 bgcolor=#E9E9E9
| 273680 ||  || — || March 9, 2007 || Palomar || NEAT || — || align=right | 1.4 km || 
|-id=681 bgcolor=#fefefe
| 273681 ||  || — || March 9, 2007 || Mount Lemmon || Mount Lemmon Survey || — || align=right data-sort-value="0.98" | 980 m || 
|-id=682 bgcolor=#E9E9E9
| 273682 ||  || — || March 9, 2007 || Catalina || CSS || ADE || align=right | 3.5 km || 
|-id=683 bgcolor=#E9E9E9
| 273683 ||  || — || March 9, 2007 || Kitt Peak || Spacewatch || — || align=right | 1.6 km || 
|-id=684 bgcolor=#fefefe
| 273684 ||  || — || March 9, 2007 || Palomar || NEAT || NYS || align=right | 1.2 km || 
|-id=685 bgcolor=#fefefe
| 273685 ||  || — || March 10, 2007 || Kitt Peak || Spacewatch || NYS || align=right data-sort-value="0.83" | 830 m || 
|-id=686 bgcolor=#E9E9E9
| 273686 ||  || — || March 10, 2007 || Mount Lemmon || Mount Lemmon Survey || — || align=right | 1.4 km || 
|-id=687 bgcolor=#E9E9E9
| 273687 ||  || — || March 12, 2007 || Altschwendt || W. Ries || — || align=right | 1.2 km || 
|-id=688 bgcolor=#fefefe
| 273688 ||  || — || March 9, 2007 || Palomar || NEAT || V || align=right data-sort-value="0.97" | 970 m || 
|-id=689 bgcolor=#fefefe
| 273689 ||  || — || March 10, 2007 || Kitt Peak || Spacewatch || — || align=right | 1.0 km || 
|-id=690 bgcolor=#fefefe
| 273690 ||  || — || March 10, 2007 || Kitt Peak || Spacewatch || — || align=right | 1.0 km || 
|-id=691 bgcolor=#fefefe
| 273691 ||  || — || March 10, 2007 || Mount Lemmon || Mount Lemmon Survey || NYS || align=right data-sort-value="0.77" | 770 m || 
|-id=692 bgcolor=#fefefe
| 273692 ||  || — || March 10, 2007 || Kitt Peak || Spacewatch || NYS || align=right data-sort-value="0.94" | 940 m || 
|-id=693 bgcolor=#fefefe
| 273693 ||  || — || March 11, 2007 || Kitt Peak || Spacewatch || V || align=right | 1.0 km || 
|-id=694 bgcolor=#fefefe
| 273694 ||  || — || March 11, 2007 || Mount Lemmon || Mount Lemmon Survey || — || align=right | 1.2 km || 
|-id=695 bgcolor=#E9E9E9
| 273695 ||  || — || March 12, 2007 || Marly || P. Kocher || EUN || align=right | 1.3 km || 
|-id=696 bgcolor=#fefefe
| 273696 ||  || — || March 12, 2007 || Bergisch Gladbac || W. Bickel || — || align=right | 1.0 km || 
|-id=697 bgcolor=#fefefe
| 273697 ||  || — || March 9, 2007 || Mount Lemmon || Mount Lemmon Survey || MAS || align=right data-sort-value="0.72" | 720 m || 
|-id=698 bgcolor=#E9E9E9
| 273698 ||  || — || March 9, 2007 || Mount Lemmon || Mount Lemmon Survey || EUN || align=right | 1.0 km || 
|-id=699 bgcolor=#fefefe
| 273699 ||  || — || March 9, 2007 || Kitt Peak || Spacewatch || — || align=right | 1.1 km || 
|-id=700 bgcolor=#E9E9E9
| 273700 ||  || — || March 9, 2007 || Kitt Peak || Spacewatch || — || align=right | 3.3 km || 
|}

273701–273800 

|-bgcolor=#E9E9E9
| 273701 ||  || — || March 9, 2007 || Kitt Peak || Spacewatch || — || align=right data-sort-value="0.97" | 970 m || 
|-id=702 bgcolor=#fefefe
| 273702 ||  || — || March 9, 2007 || Kitt Peak || Spacewatch || MAS || align=right data-sort-value="0.85" | 850 m || 
|-id=703 bgcolor=#E9E9E9
| 273703 ||  || — || March 9, 2007 || Kitt Peak || Spacewatch || — || align=right | 3.1 km || 
|-id=704 bgcolor=#E9E9E9
| 273704 ||  || — || March 9, 2007 || Kitt Peak || Spacewatch || — || align=right | 1.6 km || 
|-id=705 bgcolor=#E9E9E9
| 273705 ||  || — || March 11, 2007 || Catalina || CSS || — || align=right | 1.5 km || 
|-id=706 bgcolor=#fefefe
| 273706 ||  || — || March 9, 2007 || Mount Lemmon || Mount Lemmon Survey || NYS || align=right data-sort-value="0.74" | 740 m || 
|-id=707 bgcolor=#fefefe
| 273707 ||  || — || March 9, 2007 || Catalina || CSS || NYS || align=right | 1.0 km || 
|-id=708 bgcolor=#E9E9E9
| 273708 ||  || — || March 10, 2007 || Kitt Peak || Spacewatch || ADE || align=right | 1.8 km || 
|-id=709 bgcolor=#E9E9E9
| 273709 ||  || — || March 10, 2007 || Kitt Peak || Spacewatch || — || align=right | 2.7 km || 
|-id=710 bgcolor=#E9E9E9
| 273710 ||  || — || March 10, 2007 || Kitt Peak || Spacewatch || WIT || align=right | 1.3 km || 
|-id=711 bgcolor=#fefefe
| 273711 ||  || — || March 10, 2007 || Kitt Peak || Spacewatch || — || align=right data-sort-value="0.89" | 890 m || 
|-id=712 bgcolor=#fefefe
| 273712 ||  || — || March 10, 2007 || Kitt Peak || Spacewatch || NYS || align=right data-sort-value="0.90" | 900 m || 
|-id=713 bgcolor=#fefefe
| 273713 ||  || — || March 10, 2007 || Kitt Peak || Spacewatch || V || align=right data-sort-value="0.76" | 760 m || 
|-id=714 bgcolor=#E9E9E9
| 273714 ||  || — || March 10, 2007 || Kitt Peak || Spacewatch || — || align=right data-sort-value="0.89" | 890 m || 
|-id=715 bgcolor=#fefefe
| 273715 ||  || — || March 10, 2007 || Kitt Peak || Spacewatch || MAS || align=right | 1.1 km || 
|-id=716 bgcolor=#E9E9E9
| 273716 ||  || — || March 10, 2007 || Mount Lemmon || Mount Lemmon Survey || — || align=right data-sort-value="0.92" | 920 m || 
|-id=717 bgcolor=#fefefe
| 273717 ||  || — || March 11, 2007 || Kitt Peak || Spacewatch || V || align=right data-sort-value="0.76" | 760 m || 
|-id=718 bgcolor=#E9E9E9
| 273718 ||  || — || March 12, 2007 || Catalina || CSS || — || align=right | 3.3 km || 
|-id=719 bgcolor=#E9E9E9
| 273719 ||  || — || March 12, 2007 || Kitt Peak || Spacewatch || EUN || align=right | 1.7 km || 
|-id=720 bgcolor=#E9E9E9
| 273720 ||  || — || March 12, 2007 || Catalina || CSS || — || align=right | 2.7 km || 
|-id=721 bgcolor=#fefefe
| 273721 ||  || — || March 9, 2007 || Kitt Peak || Spacewatch || MAS || align=right data-sort-value="0.92" | 920 m || 
|-id=722 bgcolor=#fefefe
| 273722 ||  || — || March 9, 2007 || Mount Lemmon || Mount Lemmon Survey || V || align=right data-sort-value="0.75" | 750 m || 
|-id=723 bgcolor=#fefefe
| 273723 ||  || — || March 10, 2007 || Kitt Peak || Spacewatch || NYS || align=right data-sort-value="0.87" | 870 m || 
|-id=724 bgcolor=#fefefe
| 273724 ||  || — || March 10, 2007 || Kitt Peak || Spacewatch || NYS || align=right data-sort-value="0.79" | 790 m || 
|-id=725 bgcolor=#E9E9E9
| 273725 ||  || — || March 10, 2007 || Kitt Peak || Spacewatch || PAD || align=right | 1.9 km || 
|-id=726 bgcolor=#fefefe
| 273726 ||  || — || March 10, 2007 || Kitt Peak || Spacewatch || — || align=right | 1.0 km || 
|-id=727 bgcolor=#fefefe
| 273727 ||  || — || March 10, 2007 || Mount Lemmon || Mount Lemmon Survey || V || align=right data-sort-value="0.70" | 700 m || 
|-id=728 bgcolor=#fefefe
| 273728 ||  || — || March 11, 2007 || Kitt Peak || Spacewatch || NYS || align=right data-sort-value="0.74" | 740 m || 
|-id=729 bgcolor=#E9E9E9
| 273729 ||  || — || March 11, 2007 || Kitt Peak || Spacewatch || — || align=right | 1.4 km || 
|-id=730 bgcolor=#fefefe
| 273730 ||  || — || March 11, 2007 || Kitt Peak || Spacewatch || — || align=right | 1.0 km || 
|-id=731 bgcolor=#E9E9E9
| 273731 ||  || — || March 11, 2007 || Kitt Peak || Spacewatch || NEM || align=right | 2.0 km || 
|-id=732 bgcolor=#E9E9E9
| 273732 ||  || — || March 11, 2007 || Mount Lemmon || Mount Lemmon Survey || AGN || align=right | 1.6 km || 
|-id=733 bgcolor=#E9E9E9
| 273733 ||  || — || March 11, 2007 || Mount Lemmon || Mount Lemmon Survey || — || align=right | 1.7 km || 
|-id=734 bgcolor=#d6d6d6
| 273734 ||  || — || March 11, 2007 || Anderson Mesa || LONEOS || HYG || align=right | 4.6 km || 
|-id=735 bgcolor=#fefefe
| 273735 ||  || — || March 11, 2007 || Kitt Peak || Spacewatch || NYS || align=right data-sort-value="0.92" | 920 m || 
|-id=736 bgcolor=#E9E9E9
| 273736 ||  || — || March 11, 2007 || Kitt Peak || Spacewatch || — || align=right | 1.5 km || 
|-id=737 bgcolor=#E9E9E9
| 273737 ||  || — || March 11, 2007 || Kitt Peak || Spacewatch || — || align=right | 1.3 km || 
|-id=738 bgcolor=#E9E9E9
| 273738 ||  || — || March 11, 2007 || Kitt Peak || Spacewatch || — || align=right | 1.1 km || 
|-id=739 bgcolor=#fefefe
| 273739 ||  || — || March 12, 2007 || Kitt Peak || Spacewatch || NYS || align=right data-sort-value="0.65" | 650 m || 
|-id=740 bgcolor=#E9E9E9
| 273740 ||  || — || March 13, 2007 || Mount Lemmon || Mount Lemmon Survey || — || align=right | 2.9 km || 
|-id=741 bgcolor=#E9E9E9
| 273741 ||  || — || March 13, 2007 || Mount Lemmon || Mount Lemmon Survey || WIT || align=right | 1.0 km || 
|-id=742 bgcolor=#E9E9E9
| 273742 ||  || — || March 13, 2007 || Mount Lemmon || Mount Lemmon Survey || — || align=right | 1.9 km || 
|-id=743 bgcolor=#E9E9E9
| 273743 ||  || — || March 13, 2007 || Mount Lemmon || Mount Lemmon Survey || — || align=right | 1.2 km || 
|-id=744 bgcolor=#E9E9E9
| 273744 ||  || — || March 13, 2007 || Mount Lemmon || Mount Lemmon Survey || — || align=right | 1.7 km || 
|-id=745 bgcolor=#fefefe
| 273745 ||  || — || March 14, 2007 || Mount Lemmon || Mount Lemmon Survey || MAS || align=right data-sort-value="0.82" | 820 m || 
|-id=746 bgcolor=#E9E9E9
| 273746 ||  || — || March 9, 2007 || Mount Lemmon || Mount Lemmon Survey || — || align=right | 1.0 km || 
|-id=747 bgcolor=#E9E9E9
| 273747 ||  || — || March 9, 2007 || Mount Lemmon || Mount Lemmon Survey || HOF || align=right | 2.9 km || 
|-id=748 bgcolor=#E9E9E9
| 273748 ||  || — || March 9, 2007 || Mount Lemmon || Mount Lemmon Survey || — || align=right | 1.4 km || 
|-id=749 bgcolor=#E9E9E9
| 273749 ||  || — || March 10, 2007 || Mount Lemmon || Mount Lemmon Survey || — || align=right | 1.6 km || 
|-id=750 bgcolor=#E9E9E9
| 273750 ||  || — || March 10, 2007 || Mount Lemmon || Mount Lemmon Survey || — || align=right | 1.4 km || 
|-id=751 bgcolor=#fefefe
| 273751 ||  || — || March 12, 2007 || Kitt Peak || Spacewatch || NYS || align=right data-sort-value="0.89" | 890 m || 
|-id=752 bgcolor=#E9E9E9
| 273752 ||  || — || March 12, 2007 || Kitt Peak || Spacewatch || — || align=right | 2.0 km || 
|-id=753 bgcolor=#fefefe
| 273753 ||  || — || March 12, 2007 || Kitt Peak || Spacewatch || NYS || align=right | 2.5 km || 
|-id=754 bgcolor=#E9E9E9
| 273754 ||  || — || March 12, 2007 || Kitt Peak || Spacewatch || WIT || align=right | 1.1 km || 
|-id=755 bgcolor=#E9E9E9
| 273755 ||  || — || March 12, 2007 || Kitt Peak || Spacewatch || — || align=right | 1.1 km || 
|-id=756 bgcolor=#E9E9E9
| 273756 ||  || — || March 12, 2007 || Mount Lemmon || Mount Lemmon Survey || — || align=right | 1.1 km || 
|-id=757 bgcolor=#fefefe
| 273757 ||  || — || March 12, 2007 || Mount Lemmon || Mount Lemmon Survey || NYS || align=right | 1.1 km || 
|-id=758 bgcolor=#E9E9E9
| 273758 ||  || — || March 12, 2007 || Mount Lemmon || Mount Lemmon Survey || — || align=right | 1.2 km || 
|-id=759 bgcolor=#E9E9E9
| 273759 ||  || — || March 12, 2007 || Mount Lemmon || Mount Lemmon Survey || — || align=right | 1.4 km || 
|-id=760 bgcolor=#E9E9E9
| 273760 ||  || — || March 12, 2007 || Mount Lemmon || Mount Lemmon Survey || HOF || align=right | 3.0 km || 
|-id=761 bgcolor=#fefefe
| 273761 ||  || — || March 12, 2007 || Mount Lemmon || Mount Lemmon Survey || — || align=right data-sort-value="0.90" | 900 m || 
|-id=762 bgcolor=#E9E9E9
| 273762 ||  || — || March 12, 2007 || Kitt Peak || Spacewatch || — || align=right | 1.5 km || 
|-id=763 bgcolor=#E9E9E9
| 273763 ||  || — || March 12, 2007 || Kitt Peak || Spacewatch || — || align=right | 1.5 km || 
|-id=764 bgcolor=#fefefe
| 273764 ||  || — || March 14, 2007 || Mount Lemmon || Mount Lemmon Survey || NYS || align=right data-sort-value="0.92" | 920 m || 
|-id=765 bgcolor=#fefefe
| 273765 ||  || — || March 15, 2007 || Mount Lemmon || Mount Lemmon Survey || NYS || align=right data-sort-value="0.76" | 760 m || 
|-id=766 bgcolor=#fefefe
| 273766 ||  || — || March 10, 2007 || Palomar || NEAT || — || align=right | 1.2 km || 
|-id=767 bgcolor=#E9E9E9
| 273767 ||  || — || March 13, 2007 || Kitt Peak || Spacewatch || — || align=right | 1.1 km || 
|-id=768 bgcolor=#E9E9E9
| 273768 ||  || — || March 13, 2007 || Kitt Peak || Spacewatch || — || align=right | 1.1 km || 
|-id=769 bgcolor=#E9E9E9
| 273769 ||  || — || March 15, 2007 || Kitt Peak || Spacewatch || — || align=right | 1.6 km || 
|-id=770 bgcolor=#E9E9E9
| 273770 ||  || — || March 14, 2007 || Mount Lemmon || Mount Lemmon Survey || — || align=right | 1.7 km || 
|-id=771 bgcolor=#E9E9E9
| 273771 ||  || — || March 14, 2007 || Kitt Peak || Spacewatch || — || align=right | 1.8 km || 
|-id=772 bgcolor=#E9E9E9
| 273772 ||  || — || March 14, 2007 || Kitt Peak || Spacewatch || — || align=right | 1.1 km || 
|-id=773 bgcolor=#E9E9E9
| 273773 ||  || — || March 13, 2007 || Kitt Peak || Spacewatch || — || align=right | 1.6 km || 
|-id=774 bgcolor=#E9E9E9
| 273774 ||  || — || March 13, 2007 || Lulin || C.-S. Lin, Q.-z. Ye || — || align=right | 1.9 km || 
|-id=775 bgcolor=#fefefe
| 273775 ||  || — || March 15, 2007 || Kitt Peak || Spacewatch || — || align=right | 1.0 km || 
|-id=776 bgcolor=#fefefe
| 273776 ||  || — || March 10, 2007 || Catalina || CSS || PHO || align=right | 1.2 km || 
|-id=777 bgcolor=#fefefe
| 273777 ||  || — || March 9, 2007 || Catalina || CSS || NYS || align=right data-sort-value="0.97" | 970 m || 
|-id=778 bgcolor=#fefefe
| 273778 ||  || — || March 14, 2007 || Socorro || LINEAR || — || align=right | 1.3 km || 
|-id=779 bgcolor=#fefefe
| 273779 ||  || — || March 6, 2007 || Palomar || NEAT || — || align=right | 1.2 km || 
|-id=780 bgcolor=#E9E9E9
| 273780 ||  || — || March 8, 2007 || Palomar || NEAT || — || align=right | 1.6 km || 
|-id=781 bgcolor=#E9E9E9
| 273781 ||  || — || March 15, 2007 || Kitt Peak || Spacewatch || — || align=right | 2.5 km || 
|-id=782 bgcolor=#E9E9E9
| 273782 ||  || — || March 11, 2007 || Mount Lemmon || Mount Lemmon Survey || — || align=right data-sort-value="0.97" | 970 m || 
|-id=783 bgcolor=#d6d6d6
| 273783 ||  || — || March 13, 2007 || Kitt Peak || Spacewatch || — || align=right | 3.7 km || 
|-id=784 bgcolor=#E9E9E9
| 273784 ||  || — || March 11, 2007 || Mount Lemmon || Mount Lemmon Survey || — || align=right | 3.1 km || 
|-id=785 bgcolor=#E9E9E9
| 273785 ||  || — || March 10, 2007 || Kitt Peak || Spacewatch || — || align=right | 1.0 km || 
|-id=786 bgcolor=#fefefe
| 273786 ||  || — || March 16, 2007 || Mount Lemmon || Mount Lemmon Survey || — || align=right | 1.5 km || 
|-id=787 bgcolor=#E9E9E9
| 273787 ||  || — || March 16, 2007 || Kitt Peak || Spacewatch || — || align=right | 1.2 km || 
|-id=788 bgcolor=#fefefe
| 273788 ||  || — || March 16, 2007 || Catalina || CSS || — || align=right | 1.4 km || 
|-id=789 bgcolor=#E9E9E9
| 273789 ||  || — || March 18, 2007 || Kitt Peak || Spacewatch || — || align=right | 1.3 km || 
|-id=790 bgcolor=#fefefe
| 273790 ||  || — || March 16, 2007 || Kitt Peak || Spacewatch || — || align=right | 1.2 km || 
|-id=791 bgcolor=#E9E9E9
| 273791 ||  || — || March 16, 2007 || Anderson Mesa || LONEOS || — || align=right | 3.5 km || 
|-id=792 bgcolor=#E9E9E9
| 273792 ||  || — || March 16, 2007 || Kitt Peak || Spacewatch || — || align=right | 1.8 km || 
|-id=793 bgcolor=#fefefe
| 273793 ||  || — || March 17, 2007 || Kitt Peak || Spacewatch || NYS || align=right data-sort-value="0.75" | 750 m || 
|-id=794 bgcolor=#d6d6d6
| 273794 ||  || — || March 19, 2007 || Catalina || CSS || HYG || align=right | 4.8 km || 
|-id=795 bgcolor=#E9E9E9
| 273795 ||  || — || March 20, 2007 || Kitt Peak || Spacewatch || — || align=right | 1.3 km || 
|-id=796 bgcolor=#fefefe
| 273796 ||  || — || March 19, 2007 || La Sagra || OAM Obs. || — || align=right | 1.2 km || 
|-id=797 bgcolor=#E9E9E9
| 273797 ||  || — || March 20, 2007 || Mount Lemmon || Mount Lemmon Survey || — || align=right | 1.4 km || 
|-id=798 bgcolor=#E9E9E9
| 273798 ||  || — || March 20, 2007 || Mount Lemmon || Mount Lemmon Survey || — || align=right data-sort-value="0.83" | 830 m || 
|-id=799 bgcolor=#E9E9E9
| 273799 ||  || — || March 20, 2007 || Kitt Peak || Spacewatch || RAF || align=right | 1.1 km || 
|-id=800 bgcolor=#E9E9E9
| 273800 ||  || — || March 20, 2007 || Kitt Peak || Spacewatch || — || align=right data-sort-value="0.85" | 850 m || 
|}

273801–273900 

|-bgcolor=#fefefe
| 273801 ||  || — || March 20, 2007 || Kitt Peak || Spacewatch || MAS || align=right | 1.1 km || 
|-id=802 bgcolor=#fefefe
| 273802 ||  || — || March 20, 2007 || Kitt Peak || Spacewatch || — || align=right data-sort-value="0.97" | 970 m || 
|-id=803 bgcolor=#E9E9E9
| 273803 ||  || — || March 20, 2007 || Kitt Peak || Spacewatch || — || align=right | 1.0 km || 
|-id=804 bgcolor=#fefefe
| 273804 ||  || — || March 20, 2007 || Mount Lemmon || Mount Lemmon Survey || — || align=right data-sort-value="0.98" | 980 m || 
|-id=805 bgcolor=#E9E9E9
| 273805 ||  || — || March 20, 2007 || Kitt Peak || Spacewatch || — || align=right | 1.1 km || 
|-id=806 bgcolor=#E9E9E9
| 273806 ||  || — || March 20, 2007 || Mount Lemmon || Mount Lemmon Survey || — || align=right data-sort-value="0.90" | 900 m || 
|-id=807 bgcolor=#fefefe
| 273807 ||  || — || March 20, 2007 || Mount Lemmon || Mount Lemmon Survey || NYS || align=right data-sort-value="0.61" | 610 m || 
|-id=808 bgcolor=#fefefe
| 273808 ||  || — || March 20, 2007 || Mount Lemmon || Mount Lemmon Survey || NYS || align=right data-sort-value="0.83" | 830 m || 
|-id=809 bgcolor=#E9E9E9
| 273809 ||  || — || March 20, 2007 || Kitt Peak || Spacewatch || — || align=right | 1.7 km || 
|-id=810 bgcolor=#E9E9E9
| 273810 ||  || — || March 20, 2007 || Kitt Peak || Spacewatch || — || align=right data-sort-value="0.91" | 910 m || 
|-id=811 bgcolor=#E9E9E9
| 273811 ||  || — || March 20, 2007 || Kitt Peak || Spacewatch || — || align=right | 1.7 km || 
|-id=812 bgcolor=#E9E9E9
| 273812 ||  || — || March 20, 2007 || Kitt Peak || Spacewatch || — || align=right | 1.5 km || 
|-id=813 bgcolor=#E9E9E9
| 273813 ||  || — || March 26, 2007 || Kitt Peak || Spacewatch || — || align=right | 1.3 km || 
|-id=814 bgcolor=#E9E9E9
| 273814 ||  || — || March 29, 2007 || Palomar || NEAT || — || align=right | 1.6 km || 
|-id=815 bgcolor=#E9E9E9
| 273815 ||  || — || March 25, 2007 || Mount Lemmon || Mount Lemmon Survey || — || align=right | 2.3 km || 
|-id=816 bgcolor=#E9E9E9
| 273816 ||  || — || March 28, 2007 || Siding Spring || SSS || — || align=right | 1.6 km || 
|-id=817 bgcolor=#E9E9E9
| 273817 ||  || — || March 26, 2007 || Mount Lemmon || Mount Lemmon Survey || — || align=right | 2.0 km || 
|-id=818 bgcolor=#E9E9E9
| 273818 ||  || — || March 20, 2007 || Kitt Peak || Spacewatch || — || align=right data-sort-value="0.99" | 990 m || 
|-id=819 bgcolor=#fefefe
| 273819 ||  || — || April 7, 2007 || Mount Lemmon || Mount Lemmon Survey || MAS || align=right | 1.1 km || 
|-id=820 bgcolor=#E9E9E9
| 273820 ||  || — || April 7, 2007 || Mount Lemmon || Mount Lemmon Survey || AGN || align=right | 1.5 km || 
|-id=821 bgcolor=#fefefe
| 273821 ||  || — || April 11, 2007 || Kitt Peak || Spacewatch || V || align=right data-sort-value="0.82" | 820 m || 
|-id=822 bgcolor=#E9E9E9
| 273822 ||  || — || April 11, 2007 || Kitt Peak || Spacewatch || EUN || align=right | 2.2 km || 
|-id=823 bgcolor=#E9E9E9
| 273823 ||  || — || April 11, 2007 || Kitt Peak || Spacewatch || — || align=right | 1.9 km || 
|-id=824 bgcolor=#E9E9E9
| 273824 ||  || — || April 11, 2007 || Mount Lemmon || Mount Lemmon Survey || — || align=right | 1.8 km || 
|-id=825 bgcolor=#E9E9E9
| 273825 ||  || — || April 11, 2007 || Mount Lemmon || Mount Lemmon Survey || — || align=right | 2.6 km || 
|-id=826 bgcolor=#d6d6d6
| 273826 ||  || — || April 11, 2007 || Mount Lemmon || Mount Lemmon Survey || — || align=right | 4.1 km || 
|-id=827 bgcolor=#E9E9E9
| 273827 ||  || — || April 11, 2007 || Mount Lemmon || Mount Lemmon Survey || — || align=right | 1.0 km || 
|-id=828 bgcolor=#E9E9E9
| 273828 ||  || — || April 11, 2007 || Mount Lemmon || Mount Lemmon Survey || — || align=right | 1.5 km || 
|-id=829 bgcolor=#E9E9E9
| 273829 ||  || — || April 11, 2007 || Mount Lemmon || Mount Lemmon Survey || — || align=right | 1.5 km || 
|-id=830 bgcolor=#E9E9E9
| 273830 ||  || — || April 11, 2007 || Mount Lemmon || Mount Lemmon Survey || — || align=right | 1.9 km || 
|-id=831 bgcolor=#E9E9E9
| 273831 ||  || — || April 11, 2007 || Mount Lemmon || Mount Lemmon Survey || — || align=right | 1.5 km || 
|-id=832 bgcolor=#E9E9E9
| 273832 ||  || — || April 11, 2007 || Mount Lemmon || Mount Lemmon Survey || RAF || align=right | 1.1 km || 
|-id=833 bgcolor=#E9E9E9
| 273833 ||  || — || April 11, 2007 || Kitt Peak || Spacewatch || — || align=right | 3.2 km || 
|-id=834 bgcolor=#E9E9E9
| 273834 ||  || — || April 13, 2007 || Siding Spring || SSS || — || align=right | 2.1 km || 
|-id=835 bgcolor=#E9E9E9
| 273835 ||  || — || April 14, 2007 || Mount Lemmon || Mount Lemmon Survey || EUN || align=right | 1.8 km || 
|-id=836 bgcolor=#d6d6d6
| 273836 Hoijyusek ||  ||  || April 13, 2007 || Lulin Observatory || Q.-z. Ye, H.-C. Lin || — || align=right | 3.9 km || 
|-id=837 bgcolor=#E9E9E9
| 273837 ||  || — || April 14, 2007 || Kitt Peak || Spacewatch || — || align=right | 1.7 km || 
|-id=838 bgcolor=#E9E9E9
| 273838 ||  || — || April 15, 2007 || Mount Lemmon || Mount Lemmon Survey || — || align=right | 1.0 km || 
|-id=839 bgcolor=#d6d6d6
| 273839 ||  || — || April 14, 2007 || Kitt Peak || Spacewatch || — || align=right | 2.6 km || 
|-id=840 bgcolor=#d6d6d6
| 273840 ||  || — || April 14, 2007 || Kitt Peak || Spacewatch || KOR || align=right | 1.6 km || 
|-id=841 bgcolor=#E9E9E9
| 273841 ||  || — || April 14, 2007 || Kitt Peak || Spacewatch || AGN || align=right | 1.5 km || 
|-id=842 bgcolor=#E9E9E9
| 273842 ||  || — || April 14, 2007 || Kitt Peak || Spacewatch || — || align=right | 1.5 km || 
|-id=843 bgcolor=#E9E9E9
| 273843 ||  || — || April 14, 2007 || Kitt Peak || Spacewatch || — || align=right | 1.2 km || 
|-id=844 bgcolor=#E9E9E9
| 273844 ||  || — || April 14, 2007 || Kitt Peak || Spacewatch || — || align=right | 2.2 km || 
|-id=845 bgcolor=#E9E9E9
| 273845 ||  || — || April 14, 2007 || Kitt Peak || Spacewatch || — || align=right | 1.7 km || 
|-id=846 bgcolor=#E9E9E9
| 273846 ||  || — || April 14, 2007 || Kitt Peak || Spacewatch || — || align=right data-sort-value="0.92" | 920 m || 
|-id=847 bgcolor=#E9E9E9
| 273847 ||  || — || April 14, 2007 || Kitt Peak || Spacewatch || — || align=right | 1.8 km || 
|-id=848 bgcolor=#E9E9E9
| 273848 ||  || — || April 14, 2007 || Kitt Peak || Spacewatch || — || align=right | 1.3 km || 
|-id=849 bgcolor=#E9E9E9
| 273849 ||  || — || April 14, 2007 || Kitt Peak || Spacewatch || — || align=right data-sort-value="0.97" | 970 m || 
|-id=850 bgcolor=#E9E9E9
| 273850 ||  || — || April 14, 2007 || Kitt Peak || Spacewatch || — || align=right | 2.2 km || 
|-id=851 bgcolor=#E9E9E9
| 273851 ||  || — || April 14, 2007 || Kitt Peak || Spacewatch || MIS || align=right | 3.7 km || 
|-id=852 bgcolor=#E9E9E9
| 273852 ||  || — || April 14, 2007 || Kitt Peak || Spacewatch || — || align=right | 3.5 km || 
|-id=853 bgcolor=#E9E9E9
| 273853 ||  || — || April 14, 2007 || Mount Lemmon || Mount Lemmon Survey || EUN || align=right | 1.5 km || 
|-id=854 bgcolor=#E9E9E9
| 273854 ||  || — || April 14, 2007 || Kitt Peak || Spacewatch || — || align=right | 1.4 km || 
|-id=855 bgcolor=#E9E9E9
| 273855 ||  || — || April 14, 2007 || Kitt Peak || Spacewatch || JUN || align=right | 1.7 km || 
|-id=856 bgcolor=#E9E9E9
| 273856 ||  || — || April 15, 2007 || Kitt Peak || Spacewatch || — || align=right | 3.9 km || 
|-id=857 bgcolor=#E9E9E9
| 273857 ||  || — || April 14, 2007 || Mount Lemmon || Mount Lemmon Survey || — || align=right | 1.6 km || 
|-id=858 bgcolor=#E9E9E9
| 273858 ||  || — || April 14, 2007 || Kitt Peak || Spacewatch || — || align=right | 1.5 km || 
|-id=859 bgcolor=#E9E9E9
| 273859 ||  || — || April 15, 2007 || Kitt Peak || Spacewatch || — || align=right | 1.5 km || 
|-id=860 bgcolor=#E9E9E9
| 273860 ||  || — || April 15, 2007 || Kitt Peak || Spacewatch || — || align=right | 1.6 km || 
|-id=861 bgcolor=#E9E9E9
| 273861 ||  || — || April 15, 2007 || Kitt Peak || Spacewatch || MRX || align=right | 1.3 km || 
|-id=862 bgcolor=#d6d6d6
| 273862 ||  || — || April 15, 2007 || Kitt Peak || Spacewatch || KOR || align=right | 1.4 km || 
|-id=863 bgcolor=#E9E9E9
| 273863 ||  || — || April 15, 2007 || Kitt Peak || Spacewatch || ADE || align=right | 2.9 km || 
|-id=864 bgcolor=#E9E9E9
| 273864 ||  || — || April 15, 2007 || Kitt Peak || Spacewatch || — || align=right | 1.7 km || 
|-id=865 bgcolor=#E9E9E9
| 273865 ||  || — || April 15, 2007 || Kitt Peak || Spacewatch || — || align=right | 1.4 km || 
|-id=866 bgcolor=#E9E9E9
| 273866 ||  || — || April 15, 2007 || Mount Lemmon || Mount Lemmon Survey || PAD || align=right | 3.2 km || 
|-id=867 bgcolor=#fefefe
| 273867 ||  || — || April 15, 2007 || Mount Lemmon || Mount Lemmon Survey || — || align=right | 1.1 km || 
|-id=868 bgcolor=#d6d6d6
| 273868 ||  || — || January 2, 2006 || Catalina || CSS || — || align=right | 4.2 km || 
|-id=869 bgcolor=#E9E9E9
| 273869 ||  || — || April 15, 2007 || Catalina || CSS || — || align=right | 4.3 km || 
|-id=870 bgcolor=#E9E9E9
| 273870 ||  || — || April 15, 2007 || Mount Lemmon || Mount Lemmon Survey || — || align=right | 3.5 km || 
|-id=871 bgcolor=#E9E9E9
| 273871 ||  || — || April 15, 2007 || Kitt Peak || Spacewatch || — || align=right | 1.4 km || 
|-id=872 bgcolor=#E9E9E9
| 273872 ||  || — || April 14, 2007 || Kitt Peak || Spacewatch || — || align=right | 1.5 km || 
|-id=873 bgcolor=#E9E9E9
| 273873 ||  || — || April 15, 2007 || Kitt Peak || Spacewatch || — || align=right | 2.7 km || 
|-id=874 bgcolor=#E9E9E9
| 273874 ||  || — || April 15, 2007 || Kitt Peak || Spacewatch || — || align=right | 2.6 km || 
|-id=875 bgcolor=#E9E9E9
| 273875 ||  || — || April 17, 2007 || 7300 || W. K. Y. Yeung || — || align=right | 2.5 km || 
|-id=876 bgcolor=#E9E9E9
| 273876 ||  || — || April 16, 2007 || Socorro || LINEAR || — || align=right | 2.8 km || 
|-id=877 bgcolor=#E9E9E9
| 273877 ||  || — || April 16, 2007 || Catalina || CSS || — || align=right | 1.1 km || 
|-id=878 bgcolor=#E9E9E9
| 273878 ||  || — || April 16, 2007 || Anderson Mesa || LONEOS || — || align=right | 1.7 km || 
|-id=879 bgcolor=#E9E9E9
| 273879 ||  || — || April 16, 2007 || Purple Mountain || PMO NEO || — || align=right | 3.5 km || 
|-id=880 bgcolor=#E9E9E9
| 273880 ||  || — || April 18, 2007 || Kitt Peak || Spacewatch || — || align=right | 1.9 km || 
|-id=881 bgcolor=#E9E9E9
| 273881 ||  || — || April 18, 2007 || Kitt Peak || Spacewatch || — || align=right | 1.0 km || 
|-id=882 bgcolor=#E9E9E9
| 273882 ||  || — || April 19, 2007 || Mount Lemmon || Mount Lemmon Survey || — || align=right | 1.1 km || 
|-id=883 bgcolor=#E9E9E9
| 273883 ||  || — || April 16, 2007 || Catalina || CSS || — || align=right | 5.4 km || 
|-id=884 bgcolor=#E9E9E9
| 273884 ||  || — || April 19, 2007 || Mount Lemmon || Mount Lemmon Survey || MIS || align=right | 2.6 km || 
|-id=885 bgcolor=#E9E9E9
| 273885 ||  || — || April 18, 2007 || Lulin || LUSS || — || align=right | 2.2 km || 
|-id=886 bgcolor=#E9E9E9
| 273886 ||  || — || April 18, 2007 || Kitt Peak || Spacewatch || GER || align=right | 2.0 km || 
|-id=887 bgcolor=#E9E9E9
| 273887 ||  || — || April 18, 2007 || Kitt Peak || Spacewatch || EUN || align=right | 1.2 km || 
|-id=888 bgcolor=#E9E9E9
| 273888 ||  || — || April 18, 2007 || Kitt Peak || Spacewatch || HNA || align=right | 2.4 km || 
|-id=889 bgcolor=#E9E9E9
| 273889 ||  || — || April 18, 2007 || Kitt Peak || Spacewatch || — || align=right | 1.5 km || 
|-id=890 bgcolor=#d6d6d6
| 273890 ||  || — || April 18, 2007 || Kitt Peak || Spacewatch || — || align=right | 3.3 km || 
|-id=891 bgcolor=#E9E9E9
| 273891 ||  || — || April 18, 2007 || Mount Lemmon || Mount Lemmon Survey || — || align=right | 1.2 km || 
|-id=892 bgcolor=#E9E9E9
| 273892 ||  || — || April 19, 2007 || Kitt Peak || Spacewatch || — || align=right | 1.2 km || 
|-id=893 bgcolor=#E9E9E9
| 273893 ||  || — || April 19, 2007 || Socorro || LINEAR || — || align=right | 3.1 km || 
|-id=894 bgcolor=#d6d6d6
| 273894 ||  || — || April 19, 2007 || Kitt Peak || Spacewatch || — || align=right | 4.0 km || 
|-id=895 bgcolor=#E9E9E9
| 273895 ||  || — || April 19, 2007 || Kitt Peak || Spacewatch || — || align=right | 1.9 km || 
|-id=896 bgcolor=#E9E9E9
| 273896 ||  || — || April 20, 2007 || Kitt Peak || Spacewatch || — || align=right | 1.0 km || 
|-id=897 bgcolor=#E9E9E9
| 273897 ||  || — || April 22, 2007 || Mount Lemmon || Mount Lemmon Survey || — || align=right | 2.2 km || 
|-id=898 bgcolor=#E9E9E9
| 273898 ||  || — || April 18, 2007 || Mount Lemmon || Mount Lemmon Survey || — || align=right | 1.8 km || 
|-id=899 bgcolor=#E9E9E9
| 273899 ||  || — || April 18, 2007 || Mount Lemmon || Mount Lemmon Survey || HEN || align=right | 1.1 km || 
|-id=900 bgcolor=#d6d6d6
| 273900 ||  || — || April 20, 2007 || Kitt Peak || Spacewatch || KOR || align=right | 1.8 km || 
|}

273901–274000 

|-bgcolor=#E9E9E9
| 273901 ||  || — || April 20, 2007 || Kitt Peak || Spacewatch || — || align=right | 1.0 km || 
|-id=902 bgcolor=#E9E9E9
| 273902 ||  || — || April 20, 2007 || Kitt Peak || Spacewatch || — || align=right | 1.4 km || 
|-id=903 bgcolor=#d6d6d6
| 273903 ||  || — || April 20, 2007 || Kitt Peak || Spacewatch || — || align=right | 2.6 km || 
|-id=904 bgcolor=#E9E9E9
| 273904 ||  || — || April 20, 2007 || Kitt Peak || Spacewatch || — || align=right | 1.2 km || 
|-id=905 bgcolor=#E9E9E9
| 273905 ||  || — || April 20, 2007 || Kitt Peak || Spacewatch || — || align=right | 1.0 km || 
|-id=906 bgcolor=#E9E9E9
| 273906 ||  || — || April 22, 2007 || Kitt Peak || Spacewatch || WIT || align=right | 1.3 km || 
|-id=907 bgcolor=#E9E9E9
| 273907 ||  || — || April 22, 2007 || Mount Lemmon || Mount Lemmon Survey || — || align=right | 1.2 km || 
|-id=908 bgcolor=#d6d6d6
| 273908 ||  || — || April 18, 2007 || Mount Lemmon || Mount Lemmon Survey || CHA || align=right | 2.5 km || 
|-id=909 bgcolor=#E9E9E9
| 273909 ||  || — || April 18, 2007 || Mount Lemmon || Mount Lemmon Survey || — || align=right | 1.8 km || 
|-id=910 bgcolor=#d6d6d6
| 273910 ||  || — || April 22, 2007 || Mount Lemmon || Mount Lemmon Survey || EOS || align=right | 2.2 km || 
|-id=911 bgcolor=#d6d6d6
| 273911 ||  || — || April 22, 2007 || Catalina || CSS || — || align=right | 4.1 km || 
|-id=912 bgcolor=#E9E9E9
| 273912 ||  || — || April 22, 2007 || Catalina || CSS || — || align=right | 1.2 km || 
|-id=913 bgcolor=#E9E9E9
| 273913 ||  || — || April 20, 2007 || Kitt Peak || Spacewatch || — || align=right | 3.3 km || 
|-id=914 bgcolor=#E9E9E9
| 273914 ||  || — || April 22, 2007 || Kitt Peak || Spacewatch || — || align=right | 1.1 km || 
|-id=915 bgcolor=#d6d6d6
| 273915 ||  || — || October 24, 2005 || Mauna Kea || A. Boattini || KOR || align=right | 1.9 km || 
|-id=916 bgcolor=#E9E9E9
| 273916 ||  || — || April 22, 2007 || Catalina || CSS || — || align=right | 1.7 km || 
|-id=917 bgcolor=#E9E9E9
| 273917 ||  || — || April 22, 2007 || Catalina || CSS || ADE || align=right | 4.6 km || 
|-id=918 bgcolor=#E9E9E9
| 273918 ||  || — || November 30, 2005 || Kitt Peak || Spacewatch || — || align=right | 1.5 km || 
|-id=919 bgcolor=#E9E9E9
| 273919 ||  || — || April 23, 2007 || Kitt Peak || Spacewatch || — || align=right | 1.3 km || 
|-id=920 bgcolor=#E9E9E9
| 273920 ||  || — || April 23, 2007 || Catalina || CSS || — || align=right | 2.7 km || 
|-id=921 bgcolor=#E9E9E9
| 273921 ||  || — || April 24, 2007 || Kitt Peak || Spacewatch || ADE || align=right | 4.6 km || 
|-id=922 bgcolor=#E9E9E9
| 273922 ||  || — || April 20, 2007 || Kitt Peak || Spacewatch || PAD || align=right | 2.7 km || 
|-id=923 bgcolor=#E9E9E9
| 273923 ||  || — || April 22, 2007 || Siding Spring || SSS || — || align=right | 1.4 km || 
|-id=924 bgcolor=#E9E9E9
| 273924 ||  || — || April 24, 2007 || Catalina || CSS || — || align=right | 1.9 km || 
|-id=925 bgcolor=#E9E9E9
| 273925 ||  || — || April 16, 2007 || Catalina || CSS || EUN || align=right | 1.6 km || 
|-id=926 bgcolor=#E9E9E9
| 273926 ||  || — || May 7, 2007 || Kitt Peak || Spacewatch || — || align=right | 1.5 km || 
|-id=927 bgcolor=#E9E9E9
| 273927 ||  || — || May 6, 2007 || Kitt Peak || Spacewatch || JUN || align=right | 1.7 km || 
|-id=928 bgcolor=#E9E9E9
| 273928 ||  || — || May 6, 2007 || Kitt Peak || Spacewatch || — || align=right | 1.6 km || 
|-id=929 bgcolor=#E9E9E9
| 273929 ||  || — || May 7, 2007 || Kitt Peak || Spacewatch || — || align=right | 2.7 km || 
|-id=930 bgcolor=#E9E9E9
| 273930 ||  || — || May 7, 2007 || Catalina || CSS || — || align=right | 2.6 km || 
|-id=931 bgcolor=#E9E9E9
| 273931 ||  || — || May 7, 2007 || Kitt Peak || Spacewatch || — || align=right | 3.2 km || 
|-id=932 bgcolor=#E9E9E9
| 273932 ||  || — || May 7, 2007 || Kitt Peak || Spacewatch || ADE || align=right | 2.7 km || 
|-id=933 bgcolor=#E9E9E9
| 273933 ||  || — || May 7, 2007 || Kitt Peak || Spacewatch || — || align=right | 1.2 km || 
|-id=934 bgcolor=#E9E9E9
| 273934 ||  || — || May 7, 2007 || Kitt Peak || Spacewatch || — || align=right | 1.3 km || 
|-id=935 bgcolor=#E9E9E9
| 273935 ||  || — || May 10, 2007 || Mount Lemmon || Mount Lemmon Survey || — || align=right | 1.9 km || 
|-id=936 bgcolor=#E9E9E9
| 273936 Tangjingchuan ||  ||  || May 9, 2007 || Lulin || Q.-z. Ye, H.-C. Lin || — || align=right | 2.6 km || 
|-id=937 bgcolor=#E9E9E9
| 273937 ||  || — || May 7, 2007 || Mount Lemmon || Mount Lemmon Survey || — || align=right | 1.9 km || 
|-id=938 bgcolor=#E9E9E9
| 273938 ||  || — || May 11, 2007 || Mount Lemmon || Mount Lemmon Survey || — || align=right | 1.7 km || 
|-id=939 bgcolor=#E9E9E9
| 273939 ||  || — || May 10, 2007 || Kitt Peak || Spacewatch || — || align=right data-sort-value="0.98" | 980 m || 
|-id=940 bgcolor=#E9E9E9
| 273940 ||  || — || May 7, 2007 || Catalina || CSS || JUN || align=right | 1.3 km || 
|-id=941 bgcolor=#d6d6d6
| 273941 ||  || — || May 13, 2007 || Tiki || S. F. Hönig, N. Teamo || — || align=right | 4.4 km || 
|-id=942 bgcolor=#E9E9E9
| 273942 ||  || — || May 7, 2007 || Lulin || LUSS || — || align=right | 4.4 km || 
|-id=943 bgcolor=#E9E9E9
| 273943 ||  || — || May 9, 2007 || Kitt Peak || Spacewatch || PAD || align=right | 3.0 km || 
|-id=944 bgcolor=#E9E9E9
| 273944 ||  || — || May 9, 2007 || Kitt Peak || Spacewatch || HOF || align=right | 3.7 km || 
|-id=945 bgcolor=#E9E9E9
| 273945 ||  || — || May 9, 2007 || Catalina || CSS || — || align=right | 2.4 km || 
|-id=946 bgcolor=#E9E9E9
| 273946 ||  || — || May 10, 2007 || Kitt Peak || Spacewatch || — || align=right | 2.0 km || 
|-id=947 bgcolor=#E9E9E9
| 273947 ||  || — || May 10, 2007 || Kitt Peak || Spacewatch || — || align=right | 1.8 km || 
|-id=948 bgcolor=#E9E9E9
| 273948 ||  || — || May 10, 2007 || Anderson Mesa || LONEOS || — || align=right | 1.6 km || 
|-id=949 bgcolor=#E9E9E9
| 273949 ||  || — || May 13, 2007 || Mount Lemmon || Mount Lemmon Survey || — || align=right | 2.4 km || 
|-id=950 bgcolor=#E9E9E9
| 273950 ||  || — || May 12, 2007 || Kitt Peak || Spacewatch || — || align=right | 2.0 km || 
|-id=951 bgcolor=#E9E9E9
| 273951 ||  || — || May 13, 2007 || Mount Lemmon || Mount Lemmon Survey || — || align=right | 3.9 km || 
|-id=952 bgcolor=#E9E9E9
| 273952 ||  || — || May 13, 2007 || Kitt Peak || Spacewatch || — || align=right | 1.1 km || 
|-id=953 bgcolor=#E9E9E9
| 273953 ||  || — || May 12, 2007 || Mount Lemmon || Mount Lemmon Survey || — || align=right | 2.6 km || 
|-id=954 bgcolor=#E9E9E9
| 273954 ||  || — || May 13, 2007 || Mount Lemmon || Mount Lemmon Survey || — || align=right | 1.9 km || 
|-id=955 bgcolor=#E9E9E9
| 273955 ||  || — || May 7, 2007 || Kitt Peak || Spacewatch || — || align=right | 1.0 km || 
|-id=956 bgcolor=#E9E9E9
| 273956 ||  || — || May 12, 2007 || Mount Lemmon || Mount Lemmon Survey || — || align=right | 1.1 km || 
|-id=957 bgcolor=#E9E9E9
| 273957 ||  || — || May 10, 2007 || Anderson Mesa || LONEOS || — || align=right | 1.3 km || 
|-id=958 bgcolor=#d6d6d6
| 273958 ||  || — || May 17, 2007 || Kitt Peak || Spacewatch || EOS || align=right | 4.1 km || 
|-id=959 bgcolor=#E9E9E9
| 273959 ||  || — || May 18, 2007 || Wrightwood || J. W. Young || — || align=right | 2.9 km || 
|-id=960 bgcolor=#E9E9E9
| 273960 ||  || — || May 20, 2007 || Catalina || CSS || JUN || align=right | 2.1 km || 
|-id=961 bgcolor=#E9E9E9
| 273961 ||  || — || May 23, 2007 || 7300 || W. K. Y. Yeung || — || align=right | 3.4 km || 
|-id=962 bgcolor=#E9E9E9
| 273962 ||  || — || May 21, 2007 || Kitt Peak || Spacewatch || — || align=right | 3.1 km || 
|-id=963 bgcolor=#E9E9E9
| 273963 ||  || — || May 21, 2007 || Catalina || CSS || ADE || align=right | 4.0 km || 
|-id=964 bgcolor=#E9E9E9
| 273964 ||  || — || May 16, 2007 || Siding Spring || SSS || — || align=right | 2.1 km || 
|-id=965 bgcolor=#E9E9E9
| 273965 ||  || — || May 25, 2007 || Catalina || CSS || MIT || align=right | 4.1 km || 
|-id=966 bgcolor=#E9E9E9
| 273966 ||  || — || May 26, 2007 || Siding Spring || SSS || — || align=right | 3.2 km || 
|-id=967 bgcolor=#E9E9E9
| 273967 ||  || — || June 7, 2007 || Kitt Peak || Spacewatch || — || align=right | 1.8 km || 
|-id=968 bgcolor=#E9E9E9
| 273968 ||  || — || June 8, 2007 || Kitt Peak || Spacewatch || GEF || align=right | 3.7 km || 
|-id=969 bgcolor=#E9E9E9
| 273969 ||  || — || June 8, 2007 || Kitt Peak || Spacewatch || — || align=right | 1.8 km || 
|-id=970 bgcolor=#E9E9E9
| 273970 ||  || — || June 9, 2007 || Kitt Peak || Spacewatch || — || align=right | 3.2 km || 
|-id=971 bgcolor=#d6d6d6
| 273971 ||  || — || June 9, 2007 || Kitt Peak || Spacewatch || EMA || align=right | 3.3 km || 
|-id=972 bgcolor=#E9E9E9
| 273972 ||  || — || June 9, 2007 || Kitt Peak || Spacewatch || GEF || align=right | 1.5 km || 
|-id=973 bgcolor=#E9E9E9
| 273973 ||  || — || June 8, 2007 || Catalina || CSS || — || align=right | 2.5 km || 
|-id=974 bgcolor=#E9E9E9
| 273974 ||  || — || June 8, 2007 || Catalina || CSS || — || align=right | 1.5 km || 
|-id=975 bgcolor=#E9E9E9
| 273975 ||  || — || June 8, 2007 || Kitt Peak || Spacewatch || — || align=right | 1.7 km || 
|-id=976 bgcolor=#E9E9E9
| 273976 ||  || — || June 10, 2007 || Kitt Peak || Spacewatch || — || align=right | 2.9 km || 
|-id=977 bgcolor=#E9E9E9
| 273977 ||  || — || June 9, 2007 || Reedy Creek || J. Broughton || — || align=right | 1.7 km || 
|-id=978 bgcolor=#E9E9E9
| 273978 ||  || — || June 11, 2007 || La Sagra || OAM Obs. || — || align=right | 3.4 km || 
|-id=979 bgcolor=#d6d6d6
| 273979 ||  || — || June 9, 2007 || Kitt Peak || Spacewatch || — || align=right | 2.8 km || 
|-id=980 bgcolor=#E9E9E9
| 273980 ||  || — || June 12, 2007 || Kitt Peak || Spacewatch || RAF || align=right | 1.3 km || 
|-id=981 bgcolor=#d6d6d6
| 273981 ||  || — || June 12, 2007 || Kitt Peak || Spacewatch || — || align=right | 3.5 km || 
|-id=982 bgcolor=#E9E9E9
| 273982 ||  || — || June 13, 2007 || Kitt Peak || Spacewatch || EUN || align=right | 1.8 km || 
|-id=983 bgcolor=#d6d6d6
| 273983 ||  || — || June 13, 2007 || Kitt Peak || Spacewatch || — || align=right | 4.0 km || 
|-id=984 bgcolor=#E9E9E9
| 273984 ||  || — || June 14, 2007 || Kitt Peak || Spacewatch || — || align=right | 3.9 km || 
|-id=985 bgcolor=#E9E9E9
| 273985 ||  || — || June 14, 2007 || Kitt Peak || Spacewatch || WIT || align=right | 1.5 km || 
|-id=986 bgcolor=#d6d6d6
| 273986 ||  || — || June 15, 2007 || Kitt Peak || Spacewatch || EOS || align=right | 2.5 km || 
|-id=987 bgcolor=#d6d6d6
| 273987 Greggwade ||  ||  || June 11, 2007 || Mauna Kea || D. D. Balam || HYG || align=right | 2.7 km || 
|-id=988 bgcolor=#E9E9E9
| 273988 ||  || — || June 18, 2007 || Kitt Peak || Spacewatch || — || align=right | 3.4 km || 
|-id=989 bgcolor=#E9E9E9
| 273989 ||  || — || June 18, 2007 || Kitt Peak || Spacewatch || AGN || align=right | 1.5 km || 
|-id=990 bgcolor=#E9E9E9
| 273990 ||  || — || June 18, 2007 || Kitt Peak || Spacewatch || — || align=right | 1.3 km || 
|-id=991 bgcolor=#d6d6d6
| 273991 ||  || — || June 21, 2007 || Kitt Peak || Spacewatch || — || align=right | 3.6 km || 
|-id=992 bgcolor=#E9E9E9
| 273992 ||  || — || June 21, 2007 || Kitt Peak || Spacewatch || — || align=right | 1.7 km || 
|-id=993 bgcolor=#d6d6d6
| 273993 ||  || — || June 23, 2007 || Kitt Peak || Spacewatch || — || align=right | 3.7 km || 
|-id=994 bgcolor=#d6d6d6
| 273994 Cinqueterre ||  ||  || July 11, 2007 || Vallemare Borbon || V. S. Casulli || — || align=right | 4.8 km || 
|-id=995 bgcolor=#d6d6d6
| 273995 ||  || — || July 16, 2007 || Wrightwood || J. W. Young || EOS || align=right | 2.1 km || 
|-id=996 bgcolor=#E9E9E9
| 273996 || 2007 OQ || — || July 17, 2007 || Eskridge || G. Hug || — || align=right | 3.7 km || 
|-id=997 bgcolor=#d6d6d6
| 273997 ||  || — || July 20, 2007 || Tiki || S. F. Hönig, N. Teamo || — || align=right | 3.1 km || 
|-id=998 bgcolor=#d6d6d6
| 273998 ||  || — || July 19, 2007 || La Sagra || OAM Obs. || — || align=right | 3.9 km || 
|-id=999 bgcolor=#d6d6d6
| 273999 ||  || — || July 18, 2007 || Mount Lemmon || Mount Lemmon Survey || HYG || align=right | 3.0 km || 
|-id=000 bgcolor=#d6d6d6
| 274000 ||  || — || August 4, 2007 || Bergisch Gladbach || W. Bickel || — || align=right | 4.7 km || 
|}

References

External links 
 Discovery Circumstances: Numbered Minor Planets (270001)–(275000) (IAU Minor Planet Center)

0273